

448001–448100 

|-bgcolor=#E9E9E9
| 448001 ||  || — || February 8, 2008 || Kitt Peak || Spacewatch || HOF || align=right | 2.6 km || 
|-id=002 bgcolor=#d6d6d6
| 448002 ||  || — || February 10, 2008 || Mount Lemmon || Mount Lemmon Survey || — || align=right | 2.0 km || 
|-id=003 bgcolor=#FFC2E0
| 448003 || 2008 DE || — || February 12, 2008 || Catalina || CSS || APOPHA || align=right data-sort-value="0.43" | 430 m || 
|-id=004 bgcolor=#E9E9E9
| 448004 ||  || — || February 24, 2008 || Kitt Peak || Spacewatch || — || align=right | 2.3 km || 
|-id=005 bgcolor=#E9E9E9
| 448005 ||  || — || February 24, 2008 || Mount Lemmon || Mount Lemmon Survey || — || align=right | 1.2 km || 
|-id=006 bgcolor=#E9E9E9
| 448006 ||  || — || February 26, 2008 || Mount Lemmon || Mount Lemmon Survey || MRX || align=right | 1.1 km || 
|-id=007 bgcolor=#E9E9E9
| 448007 ||  || — || January 31, 2008 || Mount Lemmon || Mount Lemmon Survey || — || align=right | 1.6 km || 
|-id=008 bgcolor=#E9E9E9
| 448008 ||  || — || February 28, 2008 || Catalina || CSS || — || align=right | 2.2 km || 
|-id=009 bgcolor=#E9E9E9
| 448009 ||  || — || February 2, 2008 || Kitt Peak || Spacewatch || — || align=right | 2.3 km || 
|-id=010 bgcolor=#d6d6d6
| 448010 ||  || — || February 3, 2008 || Catalina || CSS || — || align=right | 2.3 km || 
|-id=011 bgcolor=#d6d6d6
| 448011 ||  || — || February 13, 2008 || Mount Lemmon || Mount Lemmon Survey || — || align=right | 2.8 km || 
|-id=012 bgcolor=#d6d6d6
| 448012 ||  || — || February 28, 2008 || Mount Lemmon || Mount Lemmon Survey || EOS || align=right | 1.7 km || 
|-id=013 bgcolor=#E9E9E9
| 448013 ||  || — || February 28, 2008 || Kitt Peak || Spacewatch || — || align=right | 1.9 km || 
|-id=014 bgcolor=#E9E9E9
| 448014 ||  || — || January 20, 2008 || Mount Lemmon || Mount Lemmon Survey || CLO || align=right | 1.9 km || 
|-id=015 bgcolor=#E9E9E9
| 448015 ||  || — || January 30, 2008 || Kitt Peak || Spacewatch || — || align=right | 1.9 km || 
|-id=016 bgcolor=#E9E9E9
| 448016 ||  || — || February 29, 2008 || Purple Mountain || PMO NEO || — || align=right | 1.3 km || 
|-id=017 bgcolor=#E9E9E9
| 448017 ||  || — || February 26, 2008 || Mount Lemmon || Mount Lemmon Survey || — || align=right | 1.6 km || 
|-id=018 bgcolor=#E9E9E9
| 448018 ||  || — || February 26, 2008 || Kitt Peak || Spacewatch || — || align=right | 1.5 km || 
|-id=019 bgcolor=#d6d6d6
| 448019 ||  || — || February 28, 2008 || Mount Lemmon || Mount Lemmon Survey || — || align=right | 2.8 km || 
|-id=020 bgcolor=#E9E9E9
| 448020 ||  || — || February 29, 2008 || Mount Lemmon || Mount Lemmon Survey || JUN || align=right | 1.1 km || 
|-id=021 bgcolor=#E9E9E9
| 448021 ||  || — || March 1, 2008 || Kitt Peak || Spacewatch || — || align=right | 2.2 km || 
|-id=022 bgcolor=#d6d6d6
| 448022 ||  || — || March 1, 2008 || Kitt Peak || Spacewatch || — || align=right | 2.0 km || 
|-id=023 bgcolor=#E9E9E9
| 448023 ||  || — || February 8, 2008 || Mount Lemmon || Mount Lemmon Survey || — || align=right | 2.0 km || 
|-id=024 bgcolor=#E9E9E9
| 448024 ||  || — || February 3, 2008 || Catalina || CSS || JUN || align=right | 1.0 km || 
|-id=025 bgcolor=#d6d6d6
| 448025 ||  || — || March 4, 2008 || Kitt Peak || Spacewatch || — || align=right | 2.8 km || 
|-id=026 bgcolor=#d6d6d6
| 448026 ||  || — || March 4, 2008 || Kitt Peak || Spacewatch || — || align=right | 3.7 km || 
|-id=027 bgcolor=#E9E9E9
| 448027 ||  || — || March 4, 2008 || Mount Lemmon || Mount Lemmon Survey || — || align=right | 2.5 km || 
|-id=028 bgcolor=#d6d6d6
| 448028 ||  || — || March 5, 2008 || Mount Lemmon || Mount Lemmon Survey || — || align=right | 2.9 km || 
|-id=029 bgcolor=#d6d6d6
| 448029 ||  || — || March 6, 2008 || Kitt Peak || Spacewatch || — || align=right | 2.5 km || 
|-id=030 bgcolor=#d6d6d6
| 448030 ||  || — || March 6, 2008 || Mount Lemmon || Mount Lemmon Survey || BRA || align=right | 1.6 km || 
|-id=031 bgcolor=#E9E9E9
| 448031 ||  || — || March 7, 2008 || Mount Lemmon || Mount Lemmon Survey || — || align=right | 2.4 km || 
|-id=032 bgcolor=#d6d6d6
| 448032 ||  || — || March 8, 2008 || Mount Lemmon || Mount Lemmon Survey || — || align=right | 2.5 km || 
|-id=033 bgcolor=#d6d6d6
| 448033 ||  || — || February 1, 2008 || Mount Lemmon || Mount Lemmon Survey || — || align=right | 2.3 km || 
|-id=034 bgcolor=#d6d6d6
| 448034 ||  || — || March 8, 2008 || Socorro || LINEAR || — || align=right | 3.9 km || 
|-id=035 bgcolor=#E9E9E9
| 448035 ||  || — || December 17, 2007 || Mount Lemmon || Mount Lemmon Survey || — || align=right | 1.5 km || 
|-id=036 bgcolor=#d6d6d6
| 448036 ||  || — || March 8, 2008 || Mount Lemmon || Mount Lemmon Survey || — || align=right | 2.4 km || 
|-id=037 bgcolor=#E9E9E9
| 448037 ||  || — || March 8, 2008 || Mount Lemmon || Mount Lemmon Survey ||  || align=right | 1.8 km || 
|-id=038 bgcolor=#E9E9E9
| 448038 ||  || — || February 29, 2008 || Kitt Peak || Spacewatch || — || align=right | 2.1 km || 
|-id=039 bgcolor=#d6d6d6
| 448039 ||  || — || March 3, 2008 || XuYi || PMO NEO || — || align=right | 3.2 km || 
|-id=040 bgcolor=#d6d6d6
| 448040 ||  || — || March 13, 2008 || Kitt Peak || Spacewatch || — || align=right | 2.0 km || 
|-id=041 bgcolor=#d6d6d6
| 448041 ||  || — || March 11, 2008 || Kitt Peak || Spacewatch || KOR || align=right | 1.2 km || 
|-id=042 bgcolor=#d6d6d6
| 448042 ||  || — || March 13, 2008 || Catalina || CSS || Tj (2.97) || align=right | 3.7 km || 
|-id=043 bgcolor=#d6d6d6
| 448043 ||  || — || March 13, 2008 || Kitt Peak || Spacewatch || — || align=right | 2.5 km || 
|-id=044 bgcolor=#d6d6d6
| 448044 ||  || — || March 10, 2008 || Kitt Peak || Spacewatch || — || align=right | 2.3 km || 
|-id=045 bgcolor=#d6d6d6
| 448045 ||  || — || January 18, 2008 || Mount Lemmon || Mount Lemmon Survey || — || align=right | 2.9 km || 
|-id=046 bgcolor=#d6d6d6
| 448046 ||  || — || March 27, 2008 || Mount Lemmon || Mount Lemmon Survey || KOR || align=right | 1.5 km || 
|-id=047 bgcolor=#E9E9E9
| 448047 ||  || — || November 20, 2006 || Kitt Peak || Spacewatch || AGN || align=right | 1.2 km || 
|-id=048 bgcolor=#E9E9E9
| 448048 ||  || — || March 28, 2008 || Mount Lemmon || Mount Lemmon Survey || AEO || align=right data-sort-value="0.93" | 930 m || 
|-id=049 bgcolor=#E9E9E9
| 448049 ||  || — || March 28, 2008 || Kitt Peak || Spacewatch ||  || align=right | 3.1 km || 
|-id=050 bgcolor=#d6d6d6
| 448050 ||  || — || March 30, 2008 || Kitt Peak || Spacewatch || — || align=right | 4.1 km || 
|-id=051 bgcolor=#E9E9E9
| 448051 Pepisensi ||  ||  || March 31, 2008 || La Murta || S. Pastor, J. A. Reyes || — || align=right | 2.9 km || 
|-id=052 bgcolor=#d6d6d6
| 448052 ||  || — || March 28, 2008 || Mount Lemmon || Mount Lemmon Survey || — || align=right | 3.4 km || 
|-id=053 bgcolor=#d6d6d6
| 448053 ||  || — || March 28, 2008 || Kitt Peak || Spacewatch || — || align=right | 3.8 km || 
|-id=054 bgcolor=#d6d6d6
| 448054 ||  || — || March 10, 2008 || Kitt Peak || Spacewatch || — || align=right | 2.8 km || 
|-id=055 bgcolor=#d6d6d6
| 448055 ||  || — || March 28, 2008 || Mount Lemmon || Mount Lemmon Survey || EOS || align=right | 1.7 km || 
|-id=056 bgcolor=#d6d6d6
| 448056 ||  || — || March 29, 2008 || Kitt Peak || Spacewatch || LIX || align=right | 2.7 km || 
|-id=057 bgcolor=#d6d6d6
| 448057 ||  || — || March 30, 2008 || Kitt Peak || Spacewatch || — || align=right | 2.6 km || 
|-id=058 bgcolor=#d6d6d6
| 448058 ||  || — || March 31, 2008 || Kitt Peak || Spacewatch || BRA || align=right | 1.3 km || 
|-id=059 bgcolor=#C2FFFF
| 448059 ||  || — || March 27, 2008 || Mount Lemmon || Mount Lemmon Survey || L5 || align=right | 8.3 km || 
|-id=060 bgcolor=#d6d6d6
| 448060 ||  || — || March 29, 2008 || Kitt Peak || Spacewatch || THM || align=right | 2.4 km || 
|-id=061 bgcolor=#fefefe
| 448061 ||  || — || March 31, 2008 || Mount Lemmon || Mount Lemmon Survey || — || align=right data-sort-value="0.57" | 570 m || 
|-id=062 bgcolor=#d6d6d6
| 448062 ||  || — || April 1, 2008 || Mount Lemmon || Mount Lemmon Survey || — || align=right | 2.8 km || 
|-id=063 bgcolor=#d6d6d6
| 448063 ||  || — || April 3, 2008 || Kitt Peak || Spacewatch || — || align=right | 3.1 km || 
|-id=064 bgcolor=#d6d6d6
| 448064 ||  || — || April 4, 2008 || Mount Lemmon || Mount Lemmon Survey || — || align=right | 2.3 km || 
|-id=065 bgcolor=#d6d6d6
| 448065 ||  || — || March 28, 2008 || Kitt Peak || Spacewatch || — || align=right | 2.8 km || 
|-id=066 bgcolor=#d6d6d6
| 448066 ||  || — || April 5, 2008 || Mount Lemmon || Mount Lemmon Survey || — || align=right | 2.4 km || 
|-id=067 bgcolor=#E9E9E9
| 448067 ||  || — || April 5, 2008 || Mount Lemmon || Mount Lemmon Survey || — || align=right | 2.1 km || 
|-id=068 bgcolor=#d6d6d6
| 448068 ||  || — || March 1, 2008 || Kitt Peak || Spacewatch || BRA || align=right | 1.4 km || 
|-id=069 bgcolor=#d6d6d6
| 448069 ||  || — || April 7, 2008 || Mount Lemmon || Mount Lemmon Survey || EOS || align=right | 1.6 km || 
|-id=070 bgcolor=#E9E9E9
| 448070 ||  || — || April 7, 2008 || Mount Lemmon || Mount Lemmon Survey || — || align=right | 2.4 km || 
|-id=071 bgcolor=#E9E9E9
| 448071 ||  || — || April 8, 2008 || Mount Lemmon || Mount Lemmon Survey || — || align=right | 1.8 km || 
|-id=072 bgcolor=#d6d6d6
| 448072 ||  || — || March 5, 2008 || Mount Lemmon || Mount Lemmon Survey || — || align=right | 3.9 km || 
|-id=073 bgcolor=#fefefe
| 448073 ||  || — || April 6, 2008 || Mount Lemmon || Mount Lemmon Survey || — || align=right data-sort-value="0.83" | 830 m || 
|-id=074 bgcolor=#d6d6d6
| 448074 ||  || — || March 25, 2008 || Kitt Peak || Spacewatch || — || align=right | 2.3 km || 
|-id=075 bgcolor=#d6d6d6
| 448075 ||  || — || September 29, 2005 || Kitt Peak || Spacewatch || KOR || align=right | 1.2 km || 
|-id=076 bgcolor=#d6d6d6
| 448076 ||  || — || April 14, 2008 || Mount Lemmon || Mount Lemmon Survey || — || align=right | 2.4 km || 
|-id=077 bgcolor=#FA8072
| 448077 ||  || — || April 15, 2008 || Kitt Peak || Spacewatch || — || align=right data-sort-value="0.43" | 430 m || 
|-id=078 bgcolor=#d6d6d6
| 448078 ||  || — || April 4, 2008 || Kitt Peak || Spacewatch || EOS || align=right | 1.5 km || 
|-id=079 bgcolor=#d6d6d6
| 448079 ||  || — || April 6, 2008 || Kitt Peak || Spacewatch || THB || align=right | 2.9 km || 
|-id=080 bgcolor=#d6d6d6
| 448080 ||  || — || April 6, 2008 || Kitt Peak || Spacewatch || EOS || align=right | 1.5 km || 
|-id=081 bgcolor=#d6d6d6
| 448081 ||  || — || April 3, 2008 || Kitt Peak || Spacewatch || — || align=right | 3.1 km || 
|-id=082 bgcolor=#fefefe
| 448082 ||  || — || March 15, 2008 || Mount Lemmon || Mount Lemmon Survey || — || align=right data-sort-value="0.65" | 650 m || 
|-id=083 bgcolor=#d6d6d6
| 448083 ||  || — || March 13, 2008 || Kitt Peak || Spacewatch || — || align=right | 2.3 km || 
|-id=084 bgcolor=#d6d6d6
| 448084 ||  || — || April 28, 2008 || Mount Lemmon || Mount Lemmon Survey || — || align=right | 2.3 km || 
|-id=085 bgcolor=#d6d6d6
| 448085 ||  || — || March 29, 2008 || Kitt Peak || Spacewatch || — || align=right | 2.3 km || 
|-id=086 bgcolor=#d6d6d6
| 448086 ||  || — || April 29, 2008 || Kitt Peak || Spacewatch || — || align=right | 2.5 km || 
|-id=087 bgcolor=#d6d6d6
| 448087 ||  || — || April 29, 2008 || Kitt Peak || Spacewatch || EOS || align=right | 1.7 km || 
|-id=088 bgcolor=#fefefe
| 448088 ||  || — || May 4, 2005 || Mount Lemmon || Mount Lemmon Survey || — || align=right data-sort-value="0.48" | 480 m || 
|-id=089 bgcolor=#d6d6d6
| 448089 ||  || — || April 10, 2008 || Kitt Peak || Spacewatch || — || align=right | 2.7 km || 
|-id=090 bgcolor=#fefefe
| 448090 ||  || — || April 15, 2008 || Kitt Peak || Spacewatch || — || align=right data-sort-value="0.55" | 550 m || 
|-id=091 bgcolor=#d6d6d6
| 448091 ||  || — || May 8, 2008 || Kitt Peak || Spacewatch || EOS || align=right | 1.7 km || 
|-id=092 bgcolor=#d6d6d6
| 448092 ||  || — || April 16, 2008 || Mount Lemmon || Mount Lemmon Survey || — || align=right | 2.5 km || 
|-id=093 bgcolor=#d6d6d6
| 448093 ||  || — || May 12, 2008 || Siding Spring || SSS || — || align=right | 4.3 km || 
|-id=094 bgcolor=#fefefe
| 448094 ||  || — || May 14, 2008 || Kitt Peak || Spacewatch || — || align=right data-sort-value="0.48" | 480 m || 
|-id=095 bgcolor=#d6d6d6
| 448095 ||  || — || April 30, 2008 || Mount Lemmon || Mount Lemmon Survey || — || align=right | 2.4 km || 
|-id=096 bgcolor=#d6d6d6
| 448096 ||  || — || April 30, 2008 || Mount Lemmon || Mount Lemmon Survey || — || align=right | 3.8 km || 
|-id=097 bgcolor=#d6d6d6
| 448097 ||  || — || April 3, 2008 || Mount Lemmon || Mount Lemmon Survey || — || align=right | 3.2 km || 
|-id=098 bgcolor=#fefefe
| 448098 ||  || — || April 15, 2008 || Kitt Peak || Spacewatch || — || align=right data-sort-value="0.62" | 620 m || 
|-id=099 bgcolor=#d6d6d6
| 448099 ||  || — || April 1, 2008 || Kitt Peak || Spacewatch || THM || align=right | 1.9 km || 
|-id=100 bgcolor=#d6d6d6
| 448100 ||  || — || May 5, 2008 || Kitt Peak || Spacewatch || — || align=right | 3.3 km || 
|}

448101–448200 

|-bgcolor=#d6d6d6
| 448101 ||  || — || May 2, 2008 || Kitt Peak || Spacewatch || — || align=right | 2.5 km || 
|-id=102 bgcolor=#d6d6d6
| 448102 ||  || — || May 28, 2008 || Kitt Peak || Spacewatch || THB || align=right | 3.5 km || 
|-id=103 bgcolor=#d6d6d6
| 448103 ||  || — || May 7, 2008 || Kitt Peak || Spacewatch || — || align=right | 2.8 km || 
|-id=104 bgcolor=#d6d6d6
| 448104 ||  || — || May 30, 2008 || Kitt Peak || Spacewatch || — || align=right | 2.7 km || 
|-id=105 bgcolor=#d6d6d6
| 448105 ||  || — || October 8, 2004 || Kitt Peak || Spacewatch || — || align=right | 3.1 km || 
|-id=106 bgcolor=#d6d6d6
| 448106 ||  || — || May 31, 2008 || Kitt Peak || Spacewatch || — || align=right | 3.1 km || 
|-id=107 bgcolor=#d6d6d6
| 448107 ||  || — || June 7, 2008 || Kitt Peak || Spacewatch || — || align=right | 3.2 km || 
|-id=108 bgcolor=#d6d6d6
| 448108 ||  || — || June 26, 2008 || Cerro Burek || Alianza S4 Obs. || Tj (2.99) || align=right | 3.9 km || 
|-id=109 bgcolor=#FA8072
| 448109 ||  || — || July 7, 2008 || La Sagra || OAM Obs. || — || align=right data-sort-value="0.74" | 740 m || 
|-id=110 bgcolor=#FA8072
| 448110 ||  || — || July 1, 2008 || Catalina || CSS || — || align=right | 1.0 km || 
|-id=111 bgcolor=#fefefe
| 448111 ||  || — || July 1, 2008 || Catalina || CSS || — || align=right | 1.1 km || 
|-id=112 bgcolor=#fefefe
| 448112 ||  || — || July 30, 2008 || Kitt Peak || Spacewatch || — || align=right data-sort-value="0.68" | 680 m || 
|-id=113 bgcolor=#fefefe
| 448113 ||  || — || August 5, 2008 || La Sagra || OAM Obs. || — || align=right data-sort-value="0.79" | 790 m || 
|-id=114 bgcolor=#fefefe
| 448114 ||  || — || August 10, 2008 || La Sagra || OAM Obs. || — || align=right data-sort-value="0.61" | 610 m || 
|-id=115 bgcolor=#fefefe
| 448115 ||  || — || June 28, 2008 || Siding Spring || SSS || — || align=right | 1.7 km || 
|-id=116 bgcolor=#fefefe
| 448116 ||  || — || August 25, 2008 || La Sagra || OAM Obs. || — || align=right data-sort-value="0.79" | 790 m || 
|-id=117 bgcolor=#fefefe
| 448117 ||  || — || August 23, 2008 || Kitt Peak || Spacewatch || — || align=right data-sort-value="0.71" | 710 m || 
|-id=118 bgcolor=#fefefe
| 448118 ||  || — || September 2, 2008 || Kitt Peak || Spacewatch || — || align=right data-sort-value="0.75" | 750 m || 
|-id=119 bgcolor=#fefefe
| 448119 ||  || — || August 21, 2008 || Kitt Peak || Spacewatch || — || align=right data-sort-value="0.65" | 650 m || 
|-id=120 bgcolor=#FA8072
| 448120 ||  || — || September 2, 2008 || Siding Spring || SSS || — || align=right | 1.2 km || 
|-id=121 bgcolor=#fefefe
| 448121 ||  || — || September 5, 2008 || Kitt Peak || Spacewatch || — || align=right data-sort-value="0.60" | 600 m || 
|-id=122 bgcolor=#fefefe
| 448122 ||  || — || September 6, 2008 || Mount Lemmon || Mount Lemmon Survey || — || align=right data-sort-value="0.86" | 860 m || 
|-id=123 bgcolor=#fefefe
| 448123 ||  || — || September 6, 2008 || Kitt Peak || Spacewatch || — || align=right data-sort-value="0.80" | 800 m || 
|-id=124 bgcolor=#fefefe
| 448124 ||  || — || September 7, 2008 || Mount Lemmon || Mount Lemmon Survey || — || align=right data-sort-value="0.62" | 620 m || 
|-id=125 bgcolor=#fefefe
| 448125 ||  || — || September 7, 2008 || Mount Lemmon || Mount Lemmon Survey || — || align=right data-sort-value="0.71" | 710 m || 
|-id=126 bgcolor=#fefefe
| 448126 ||  || — || September 22, 2008 || Socorro || LINEAR || V || align=right data-sort-value="0.65" | 650 m || 
|-id=127 bgcolor=#fefefe
| 448127 ||  || — || July 29, 2008 || Kitt Peak || Spacewatch || — || align=right data-sort-value="0.62" | 620 m || 
|-id=128 bgcolor=#fefefe
| 448128 ||  || — || July 29, 2008 || Kitt Peak || Spacewatch || — || align=right data-sort-value="0.75" | 750 m || 
|-id=129 bgcolor=#fefefe
| 448129 ||  || — || September 19, 2008 || Kitt Peak || Spacewatch || — || align=right data-sort-value="0.79" | 790 m || 
|-id=130 bgcolor=#fefefe
| 448130 ||  || — || September 19, 2008 || Kitt Peak || Spacewatch || — || align=right data-sort-value="0.68" | 680 m || 
|-id=131 bgcolor=#fefefe
| 448131 ||  || — || September 19, 2008 || Kitt Peak || Spacewatch || — || align=right data-sort-value="0.57" | 570 m || 
|-id=132 bgcolor=#fefefe
| 448132 ||  || — || September 6, 2008 || Catalina || CSS || — || align=right data-sort-value="0.64" | 640 m || 
|-id=133 bgcolor=#fefefe
| 448133 ||  || — || September 20, 2008 || Kitt Peak || Spacewatch || — || align=right data-sort-value="0.86" | 860 m || 
|-id=134 bgcolor=#fefefe
| 448134 ||  || — || August 24, 2008 || Kitt Peak || Spacewatch || — || align=right data-sort-value="0.73" | 730 m || 
|-id=135 bgcolor=#fefefe
| 448135 ||  || — || September 4, 2008 || Kitt Peak || Spacewatch || (1338) || align=right data-sort-value="0.62" | 620 m || 
|-id=136 bgcolor=#fefefe
| 448136 ||  || — || September 7, 2008 || Mount Lemmon || Mount Lemmon Survey || — || align=right data-sort-value="0.69" | 690 m || 
|-id=137 bgcolor=#fefefe
| 448137 ||  || — || September 22, 2008 || Kitt Peak || Spacewatch || — || align=right | 1.0 km || 
|-id=138 bgcolor=#fefefe
| 448138 ||  || — || September 22, 2008 || Mount Lemmon || Mount Lemmon Survey || — || align=right data-sort-value="0.71" | 710 m || 
|-id=139 bgcolor=#fefefe
| 448139 ||  || — || September 22, 2008 || Mount Lemmon || Mount Lemmon Survey || — || align=right data-sort-value="0.82" | 820 m || 
|-id=140 bgcolor=#fefefe
| 448140 ||  || — || September 22, 2008 || Kitt Peak || Spacewatch || — || align=right data-sort-value="0.82" | 820 m || 
|-id=141 bgcolor=#fefefe
| 448141 ||  || — || July 29, 2008 || Kitt Peak || Spacewatch || — || align=right data-sort-value="0.62" | 620 m || 
|-id=142 bgcolor=#FA8072
| 448142 ||  || — || September 23, 2008 || Catalina || CSS || — || align=right data-sort-value="0.75" | 750 m || 
|-id=143 bgcolor=#fefefe
| 448143 ||  || — || September 22, 2008 || Socorro || LINEAR || — || align=right data-sort-value="0.62" | 620 m || 
|-id=144 bgcolor=#fefefe
| 448144 ||  || — || September 24, 2008 || Socorro || LINEAR || — || align=right data-sort-value="0.72" | 720 m || 
|-id=145 bgcolor=#fefefe
| 448145 ||  || — || September 24, 2008 || Socorro || LINEAR || V || align=right data-sort-value="0.63" | 630 m || 
|-id=146 bgcolor=#fefefe
| 448146 ||  || — || September 28, 2008 || Socorro || LINEAR || — || align=right data-sort-value="0.67" | 670 m || 
|-id=147 bgcolor=#fefefe
| 448147 ||  || — || September 23, 2008 || Mount Lemmon || Mount Lemmon Survey || NYS || align=right data-sort-value="0.50" | 500 m || 
|-id=148 bgcolor=#fefefe
| 448148 ||  || — || September 24, 2008 || Kitt Peak || Spacewatch || — || align=right data-sort-value="0.74" | 740 m || 
|-id=149 bgcolor=#fefefe
| 448149 ||  || — || September 21, 2008 || Kitt Peak || Spacewatch || — || align=right data-sort-value="0.72" | 720 m || 
|-id=150 bgcolor=#fefefe
| 448150 ||  || — || September 25, 2008 || Kitt Peak || Spacewatch || — || align=right data-sort-value="0.83" | 830 m || 
|-id=151 bgcolor=#fefefe
| 448151 ||  || — || September 26, 2008 || Kitt Peak || Spacewatch || — || align=right data-sort-value="0.57" | 570 m || 
|-id=152 bgcolor=#fefefe
| 448152 ||  || — || September 26, 2008 || Kitt Peak || Spacewatch || V || align=right data-sort-value="0.62" | 620 m || 
|-id=153 bgcolor=#fefefe
| 448153 ||  || — || September 3, 2008 || Kitt Peak || Spacewatch || — || align=right data-sort-value="0.52" | 520 m || 
|-id=154 bgcolor=#fefefe
| 448154 ||  || — || September 25, 2008 || Mount Lemmon || Mount Lemmon Survey || V || align=right data-sort-value="0.54" | 540 m || 
|-id=155 bgcolor=#fefefe
| 448155 ||  || — || September 29, 2008 || Catalina || CSS || — || align=right data-sort-value="0.69" | 690 m || 
|-id=156 bgcolor=#fefefe
| 448156 ||  || — || September 4, 2008 || Kitt Peak || Spacewatch || MAS || align=right data-sort-value="0.71" | 710 m || 
|-id=157 bgcolor=#fefefe
| 448157 ||  || — || September 11, 2004 || Kitt Peak || Spacewatch || — || align=right data-sort-value="0.77" | 770 m || 
|-id=158 bgcolor=#fefefe
| 448158 ||  || — || September 22, 2008 || Kitt Peak || Spacewatch || — || align=right data-sort-value="0.65" | 650 m || 
|-id=159 bgcolor=#fefefe
| 448159 ||  || — || September 23, 2008 || Mount Lemmon || Mount Lemmon Survey || — || align=right data-sort-value="0.69" | 690 m || 
|-id=160 bgcolor=#fefefe
| 448160 ||  || — || October 1, 2008 || Mount Lemmon || Mount Lemmon Survey || NYS || align=right data-sort-value="0.61" | 610 m || 
|-id=161 bgcolor=#fefefe
| 448161 ||  || — || October 2, 2008 || Catalina || CSS || — || align=right data-sort-value="0.82" | 820 m || 
|-id=162 bgcolor=#fefefe
| 448162 ||  || — || October 1, 2008 || Kitt Peak || Spacewatch || — || align=right | 1.3 km || 
|-id=163 bgcolor=#fefefe
| 448163 ||  || — || October 1, 2008 || Mount Lemmon || Mount Lemmon Survey || — || align=right data-sort-value="0.62" | 620 m || 
|-id=164 bgcolor=#fefefe
| 448164 ||  || — || October 1, 2008 || Mount Lemmon || Mount Lemmon Survey || — || align=right data-sort-value="0.75" | 750 m || 
|-id=165 bgcolor=#fefefe
| 448165 ||  || — || October 1, 2008 || Kitt Peak || Spacewatch || — || align=right data-sort-value="0.85" | 850 m || 
|-id=166 bgcolor=#fefefe
| 448166 ||  || — || September 20, 2008 || Kitt Peak || Spacewatch || — || align=right data-sort-value="0.67" | 670 m || 
|-id=167 bgcolor=#fefefe
| 448167 ||  || — || October 2, 2008 || Kitt Peak || Spacewatch || V || align=right data-sort-value="0.68" | 680 m || 
|-id=168 bgcolor=#fefefe
| 448168 ||  || — || September 6, 2008 || Mount Lemmon || Mount Lemmon Survey || — || align=right data-sort-value="0.71" | 710 m || 
|-id=169 bgcolor=#fefefe
| 448169 ||  || — || October 2, 2008 || Kitt Peak || Spacewatch || — || align=right data-sort-value="0.79" | 790 m || 
|-id=170 bgcolor=#fefefe
| 448170 ||  || — || October 2, 2008 || Kitt Peak || Spacewatch || — || align=right data-sort-value="0.99" | 990 m || 
|-id=171 bgcolor=#fefefe
| 448171 ||  || — || April 7, 2006 || Mount Lemmon || Mount Lemmon Survey || — || align=right data-sort-value="0.83" | 830 m || 
|-id=172 bgcolor=#fefefe
| 448172 ||  || — || October 6, 2008 || Mount Lemmon || Mount Lemmon Survey || — || align=right data-sort-value="0.69" | 690 m || 
|-id=173 bgcolor=#fefefe
| 448173 ||  || — || September 22, 2008 || Kitt Peak || Spacewatch || — || align=right data-sort-value="0.82" | 820 m || 
|-id=174 bgcolor=#fefefe
| 448174 ||  || — || October 9, 2008 || Mount Lemmon || Mount Lemmon Survey || — || align=right data-sort-value="0.75" | 750 m || 
|-id=175 bgcolor=#fefefe
| 448175 ||  || — || October 9, 2008 || Mount Lemmon || Mount Lemmon Survey || — || align=right data-sort-value="0.55" | 550 m || 
|-id=176 bgcolor=#fefefe
| 448176 ||  || — || October 10, 2008 || Kitt Peak || Spacewatch || — || align=right data-sort-value="0.82" | 820 m || 
|-id=177 bgcolor=#fefefe
| 448177 ||  || — || October 1, 2008 || Catalina || CSS || — || align=right data-sort-value="0.65" | 650 m || 
|-id=178 bgcolor=#fefefe
| 448178 ||  || — || October 8, 2008 || Mount Lemmon || Mount Lemmon Survey || — || align=right data-sort-value="0.63" | 630 m || 
|-id=179 bgcolor=#fefefe
| 448179 ||  || — || October 3, 2008 || Mount Lemmon || Mount Lemmon Survey || — || align=right data-sort-value="0.65" | 650 m || 
|-id=180 bgcolor=#fefefe
| 448180 ||  || — || October 9, 2008 || Mount Lemmon || Mount Lemmon Survey || NYS || align=right data-sort-value="0.74" | 740 m || 
|-id=181 bgcolor=#fefefe
| 448181 ||  || — || October 15, 2001 || Kitt Peak || Spacewatch || — || align=right data-sort-value="0.54" | 540 m || 
|-id=182 bgcolor=#FA8072
| 448182 ||  || — || October 25, 2008 || Catalina || CSS || — || align=right data-sort-value="0.97" | 970 m || 
|-id=183 bgcolor=#fefefe
| 448183 ||  || — || October 17, 2008 || Kitt Peak || Spacewatch || — || align=right data-sort-value="0.76" | 760 m || 
|-id=184 bgcolor=#fefefe
| 448184 ||  || — || October 18, 2008 || Kitt Peak || Spacewatch || — || align=right data-sort-value="0.79" | 790 m || 
|-id=185 bgcolor=#fefefe
| 448185 ||  || — || October 18, 2008 || Kitt Peak || Spacewatch || (2076) || align=right data-sort-value="0.65" | 650 m || 
|-id=186 bgcolor=#fefefe
| 448186 ||  || — || October 20, 2008 || Kitt Peak || Spacewatch || — || align=right | 1.2 km || 
|-id=187 bgcolor=#fefefe
| 448187 ||  || — || October 20, 2008 || Kitt Peak || Spacewatch || — || align=right data-sort-value="0.96" | 960 m || 
|-id=188 bgcolor=#fefefe
| 448188 ||  || — || October 20, 2008 || Kitt Peak || Spacewatch || V || align=right data-sort-value="0.56" | 560 m || 
|-id=189 bgcolor=#fefefe
| 448189 ||  || — || October 20, 2008 || Kitt Peak || Spacewatch || — || align=right data-sort-value="0.72" | 720 m || 
|-id=190 bgcolor=#fefefe
| 448190 ||  || — || October 20, 2008 || Kitt Peak || Spacewatch || — || align=right data-sort-value="0.75" | 750 m || 
|-id=191 bgcolor=#fefefe
| 448191 ||  || — || October 20, 2008 || Kitt Peak || Spacewatch || V || align=right data-sort-value="0.70" | 700 m || 
|-id=192 bgcolor=#fefefe
| 448192 ||  || — || October 22, 2008 || Kitt Peak || Spacewatch || V || align=right data-sort-value="0.51" | 510 m || 
|-id=193 bgcolor=#fefefe
| 448193 ||  || — || September 21, 2008 || Kitt Peak || Spacewatch || — || align=right data-sort-value="0.79" | 790 m || 
|-id=194 bgcolor=#fefefe
| 448194 ||  || — || December 2, 2005 || Kitt Peak || Spacewatch || — || align=right data-sort-value="0.89" | 890 m || 
|-id=195 bgcolor=#fefefe
| 448195 ||  || — || September 23, 2008 || Kitt Peak || Spacewatch || — || align=right data-sort-value="0.62" | 620 m || 
|-id=196 bgcolor=#fefefe
| 448196 ||  || — || October 22, 2008 || Kitt Peak || Spacewatch || (2076) || align=right data-sort-value="0.87" | 870 m || 
|-id=197 bgcolor=#fefefe
| 448197 ||  || — || September 6, 2008 || Mount Lemmon || Mount Lemmon Survey || NYS || align=right data-sort-value="0.69" | 690 m || 
|-id=198 bgcolor=#fefefe
| 448198 ||  || — || September 23, 2008 || Mount Lemmon || Mount Lemmon Survey || NYS || align=right data-sort-value="0.69" | 690 m || 
|-id=199 bgcolor=#fefefe
| 448199 ||  || — || October 23, 2008 || Kitt Peak || Spacewatch || critical || align=right data-sort-value="0.54" | 540 m || 
|-id=200 bgcolor=#fefefe
| 448200 ||  || — || October 23, 2008 || Kitt Peak || Spacewatch || — || align=right | 1.0 km || 
|}

448201–448300 

|-bgcolor=#fefefe
| 448201 ||  || — || October 23, 2008 || Kitt Peak || Spacewatch || — || align=right data-sort-value="0.87" | 870 m || 
|-id=202 bgcolor=#fefefe
| 448202 ||  || — || October 23, 2008 || Kitt Peak || Spacewatch || — || align=right data-sort-value="0.75" | 750 m || 
|-id=203 bgcolor=#d6d6d6
| 448203 ||  || — || October 24, 2008 || Kitt Peak || Spacewatch || SHU3:2 || align=right | 4.6 km || 
|-id=204 bgcolor=#fefefe
| 448204 ||  || — || September 22, 2008 || Mount Lemmon || Mount Lemmon Survey || MAS || align=right data-sort-value="0.75" | 750 m || 
|-id=205 bgcolor=#fefefe
| 448205 ||  || — || October 25, 2008 || Kitt Peak || Spacewatch || — || align=right data-sort-value="0.82" | 820 m || 
|-id=206 bgcolor=#fefefe
| 448206 ||  || — || October 25, 2008 || Mount Lemmon || Mount Lemmon Survey || V || align=right data-sort-value="0.71" | 710 m || 
|-id=207 bgcolor=#fefefe
| 448207 ||  || — || October 22, 2008 || Kitt Peak || Spacewatch || — || align=right data-sort-value="0.98" | 980 m || 
|-id=208 bgcolor=#fefefe
| 448208 ||  || — || September 22, 2008 || Kitt Peak || Spacewatch || — || align=right data-sort-value="0.82" | 820 m || 
|-id=209 bgcolor=#fefefe
| 448209 ||  || — || September 7, 2008 || Mount Lemmon || Mount Lemmon Survey || — || align=right data-sort-value="0.75" | 750 m || 
|-id=210 bgcolor=#fefefe
| 448210 ||  || — || October 26, 2008 || Kitt Peak || Spacewatch || V || align=right data-sort-value="0.64" | 640 m || 
|-id=211 bgcolor=#fefefe
| 448211 ||  || — || October 26, 2008 || Kitt Peak || Spacewatch || — || align=right data-sort-value="0.67" | 670 m || 
|-id=212 bgcolor=#fefefe
| 448212 ||  || — || October 26, 2008 || Kitt Peak || Spacewatch || MAS || align=right data-sort-value="0.59" | 590 m || 
|-id=213 bgcolor=#fefefe
| 448213 ||  || — || October 23, 2008 || Kitt Peak || Spacewatch || ERI || align=right | 1.4 km || 
|-id=214 bgcolor=#fefefe
| 448214 ||  || — || October 27, 2008 || Kitt Peak || Spacewatch || — || align=right data-sort-value="0.82" | 820 m || 
|-id=215 bgcolor=#fefefe
| 448215 ||  || — || February 4, 2006 || Kitt Peak || Spacewatch || — || align=right data-sort-value="0.82" | 820 m || 
|-id=216 bgcolor=#fefefe
| 448216 ||  || — || October 28, 2008 || Mount Lemmon || Mount Lemmon Survey || — || align=right data-sort-value="0.62" | 620 m || 
|-id=217 bgcolor=#fefefe
| 448217 ||  || — || October 28, 2008 || Mount Lemmon || Mount Lemmon Survey || — || align=right data-sort-value="0.54" | 540 m || 
|-id=218 bgcolor=#fefefe
| 448218 ||  || — || October 28, 2008 || Mount Lemmon || Mount Lemmon Survey || NYS || align=right data-sort-value="0.58" | 580 m || 
|-id=219 bgcolor=#fefefe
| 448219 ||  || — || October 29, 2008 || Kitt Peak || Spacewatch || — || align=right data-sort-value="0.96" | 960 m || 
|-id=220 bgcolor=#fefefe
| 448220 ||  || — || September 28, 2008 || Catalina || CSS || — || align=right | 1.4 km || 
|-id=221 bgcolor=#fefefe
| 448221 ||  || — || October 31, 2008 || Kitt Peak || Spacewatch || — || align=right data-sort-value="0.68" | 680 m || 
|-id=222 bgcolor=#fefefe
| 448222 ||  || — || October 27, 2008 || Mount Lemmon || Mount Lemmon Survey || — || align=right data-sort-value="0.63" | 630 m || 
|-id=223 bgcolor=#fefefe
| 448223 ||  || — || October 23, 2008 || Mount Lemmon || Mount Lemmon Survey || NYS || align=right data-sort-value="0.52" | 520 m || 
|-id=224 bgcolor=#fefefe
| 448224 ||  || — || October 24, 2008 || Kitt Peak || Spacewatch || — || align=right data-sort-value="0.63" | 630 m || 
|-id=225 bgcolor=#FA8072
| 448225 ||  || — || November 3, 2008 || Bisei SG Center || BATTeRS || — || align=right | 1.6 km || 
|-id=226 bgcolor=#fefefe
| 448226 ||  || — || November 1, 2008 || Mount Lemmon || Mount Lemmon Survey || NYS || align=right data-sort-value="0.60" | 600 m || 
|-id=227 bgcolor=#fefefe
| 448227 ||  || — || November 1, 2008 || Mount Lemmon || Mount Lemmon Survey || — || align=right data-sort-value="0.79" | 790 m || 
|-id=228 bgcolor=#fefefe
| 448228 ||  || — || November 1, 2008 || Kitt Peak || Spacewatch || — || align=right | 1.0 km || 
|-id=229 bgcolor=#fefefe
| 448229 ||  || — || November 3, 2008 || Kitt Peak || Spacewatch || MAS || align=right data-sort-value="0.71" | 710 m || 
|-id=230 bgcolor=#E9E9E9
| 448230 ||  || — || November 6, 2008 || Mount Lemmon || Mount Lemmon Survey || — || align=right | 1.4 km || 
|-id=231 bgcolor=#fefefe
| 448231 ||  || — || November 1, 2008 || Mount Lemmon || Mount Lemmon Survey || — || align=right data-sort-value="0.78" | 780 m || 
|-id=232 bgcolor=#fefefe
| 448232 ||  || — || November 1, 2008 || Mount Lemmon || Mount Lemmon Survey || V || align=right data-sort-value="0.60" | 600 m || 
|-id=233 bgcolor=#fefefe
| 448233 ||  || — || November 17, 2008 || Kitt Peak || Spacewatch || — || align=right | 2.3 km || 
|-id=234 bgcolor=#fefefe
| 448234 ||  || — || November 18, 2008 || Catalina || CSS || NYS || align=right data-sort-value="0.66" | 660 m || 
|-id=235 bgcolor=#fefefe
| 448235 ||  || — || November 18, 2008 || Catalina || CSS || critical || align=right data-sort-value="0.68" | 680 m || 
|-id=236 bgcolor=#fefefe
| 448236 ||  || — || September 22, 2008 || Mount Lemmon || Mount Lemmon Survey || — || align=right data-sort-value="0.78" | 780 m || 
|-id=237 bgcolor=#fefefe
| 448237 ||  || — || November 19, 2008 || Mount Lemmon || Mount Lemmon Survey || — || align=right data-sort-value="0.75" | 750 m || 
|-id=238 bgcolor=#fefefe
| 448238 ||  || — || November 19, 2008 || Mount Lemmon || Mount Lemmon Survey || — || align=right data-sort-value="0.65" | 650 m || 
|-id=239 bgcolor=#fefefe
| 448239 ||  || — || September 27, 2008 || Mount Lemmon || Mount Lemmon Survey || NYS || align=right data-sort-value="0.60" | 600 m || 
|-id=240 bgcolor=#fefefe
| 448240 ||  || — || September 9, 2008 || Mount Lemmon || Mount Lemmon Survey || NYS || align=right data-sort-value="0.55" | 550 m || 
|-id=241 bgcolor=#fefefe
| 448241 ||  || — || October 21, 2008 || Mount Lemmon || Mount Lemmon Survey || — || align=right data-sort-value="0.78" | 780 m || 
|-id=242 bgcolor=#fefefe
| 448242 ||  || — || November 18, 2008 || Catalina || CSS || — || align=right data-sort-value="0.83" | 830 m || 
|-id=243 bgcolor=#fefefe
| 448243 ||  || — || November 19, 2008 || Kitt Peak || Spacewatch || — || align=right data-sort-value="0.55" | 550 m || 
|-id=244 bgcolor=#fefefe
| 448244 ||  || — || October 1, 2008 || Mount Lemmon || Mount Lemmon Survey || — || align=right data-sort-value="0.73" | 730 m || 
|-id=245 bgcolor=#fefefe
| 448245 ||  || — || November 7, 2008 || Mount Lemmon || Mount Lemmon Survey || — || align=right data-sort-value="0.61" | 610 m || 
|-id=246 bgcolor=#fefefe
| 448246 ||  || — || April 18, 2007 || Mount Lemmon || Mount Lemmon Survey || V || align=right data-sort-value="0.54" | 540 m || 
|-id=247 bgcolor=#fefefe
| 448247 ||  || — || September 24, 2008 || Mount Lemmon || Mount Lemmon Survey || MAS || align=right data-sort-value="0.65" | 650 m || 
|-id=248 bgcolor=#fefefe
| 448248 ||  || — || October 24, 2008 || Kitt Peak || Spacewatch || — || align=right data-sort-value="0.76" | 760 m || 
|-id=249 bgcolor=#fefefe
| 448249 ||  || — || November 30, 2008 || Kitt Peak || Spacewatch || — || align=right data-sort-value="0.62" | 620 m || 
|-id=250 bgcolor=#fefefe
| 448250 ||  || — || November 30, 2008 || Mount Lemmon || Mount Lemmon Survey || — || align=right data-sort-value="0.71" | 710 m || 
|-id=251 bgcolor=#fefefe
| 448251 ||  || — || November 30, 2008 || Mount Lemmon || Mount Lemmon Survey || — || align=right | 1.0 km || 
|-id=252 bgcolor=#fefefe
| 448252 ||  || — || November 24, 2008 || Mount Lemmon || Mount Lemmon Survey || MAS || align=right data-sort-value="0.74" | 740 m || 
|-id=253 bgcolor=#fefefe
| 448253 ||  || — || November 6, 2008 || Kitt Peak || Spacewatch || — || align=right data-sort-value="0.54" | 540 m || 
|-id=254 bgcolor=#fefefe
| 448254 ||  || — || December 4, 2008 || Socorro || LINEAR || — || align=right data-sort-value="0.94" | 940 m || 
|-id=255 bgcolor=#fefefe
| 448255 ||  || — || December 1, 2008 || Kitt Peak || Spacewatch || — || align=right data-sort-value="0.75" | 750 m || 
|-id=256 bgcolor=#fefefe
| 448256 ||  || — || December 4, 2008 || Mount Lemmon || Mount Lemmon Survey || — || align=right data-sort-value="0.89" | 890 m || 
|-id=257 bgcolor=#fefefe
| 448257 ||  || — || December 4, 2008 || Kitt Peak || Spacewatch || — || align=right data-sort-value="0.99" | 990 m || 
|-id=258 bgcolor=#fefefe
| 448258 ||  || — || December 7, 2008 || Mount Lemmon || Mount Lemmon Survey || — || align=right data-sort-value="0.55" | 550 m || 
|-id=259 bgcolor=#fefefe
| 448259 ||  || — || December 23, 2008 || Dauban || F. Kugel || — || align=right data-sort-value="0.87" | 870 m || 
|-id=260 bgcolor=#fefefe
| 448260 ||  || — || December 4, 2008 || Mount Lemmon || Mount Lemmon Survey || — || align=right data-sort-value="0.89" | 890 m || 
|-id=261 bgcolor=#E9E9E9
| 448261 ||  || — || December 21, 2008 || Mount Lemmon || Mount Lemmon Survey || — || align=right | 2.3 km || 
|-id=262 bgcolor=#fefefe
| 448262 ||  || — || December 21, 2008 || Mount Lemmon || Mount Lemmon Survey || NYS || align=right data-sort-value="0.60" | 600 m || 
|-id=263 bgcolor=#fefefe
| 448263 ||  || — || December 29, 2008 || Mount Lemmon || Mount Lemmon Survey || — || align=right data-sort-value="0.62" | 620 m || 
|-id=264 bgcolor=#fefefe
| 448264 ||  || — || December 29, 2008 || Mount Lemmon || Mount Lemmon Survey || — || align=right data-sort-value="0.79" | 790 m || 
|-id=265 bgcolor=#fefefe
| 448265 ||  || — || December 29, 2008 || Mount Lemmon || Mount Lemmon Survey || — || align=right data-sort-value="0.68" | 680 m || 
|-id=266 bgcolor=#fefefe
| 448266 ||  || — || October 23, 2008 || Mount Lemmon || Mount Lemmon Survey || NYS || align=right data-sort-value="0.63" | 630 m || 
|-id=267 bgcolor=#fefefe
| 448267 ||  || — || December 30, 2008 || Kitt Peak || Spacewatch || — || align=right data-sort-value="0.72" | 720 m || 
|-id=268 bgcolor=#fefefe
| 448268 ||  || — || October 30, 2008 || Kitt Peak || Spacewatch || — || align=right data-sort-value="0.71" | 710 m || 
|-id=269 bgcolor=#fefefe
| 448269 ||  || — || December 21, 2008 || Kitt Peak || Spacewatch || MAS || align=right data-sort-value="0.73" | 730 m || 
|-id=270 bgcolor=#fefefe
| 448270 ||  || — || December 29, 2008 || Kitt Peak || Spacewatch || — || align=right data-sort-value="0.68" | 680 m || 
|-id=271 bgcolor=#d6d6d6
| 448271 ||  || — || December 29, 2008 || Kitt Peak || Spacewatch || 3:2 || align=right | 4.0 km || 
|-id=272 bgcolor=#fefefe
| 448272 ||  || — || December 29, 2008 || Kitt Peak || Spacewatch || MAS || align=right data-sort-value="0.62" | 620 m || 
|-id=273 bgcolor=#fefefe
| 448273 ||  || — || December 29, 2008 || Kitt Peak || Spacewatch || MAS || align=right data-sort-value="0.69" | 690 m || 
|-id=274 bgcolor=#fefefe
| 448274 ||  || — || April 2, 2006 || Kitt Peak || Spacewatch || — || align=right data-sort-value="0.68" | 680 m || 
|-id=275 bgcolor=#fefefe
| 448275 ||  || — || December 30, 2008 || Kitt Peak || Spacewatch || NYS || align=right data-sort-value="0.72" | 720 m || 
|-id=276 bgcolor=#fefefe
| 448276 ||  || — || November 24, 2008 || Mount Lemmon || Mount Lemmon Survey || MAS || align=right data-sort-value="0.70" | 700 m || 
|-id=277 bgcolor=#fefefe
| 448277 ||  || — || December 30, 2008 || Kitt Peak || Spacewatch || — || align=right data-sort-value="0.75" | 750 m || 
|-id=278 bgcolor=#fefefe
| 448278 ||  || — || December 30, 2008 || Mount Lemmon || Mount Lemmon Survey || — || align=right data-sort-value="0.69" | 690 m || 
|-id=279 bgcolor=#fefefe
| 448279 ||  || — || December 30, 2008 || Kitt Peak || Spacewatch || NYS || align=right data-sort-value="0.72" | 720 m || 
|-id=280 bgcolor=#fefefe
| 448280 ||  || — || December 30, 2008 || Mount Lemmon || Mount Lemmon Survey || — || align=right data-sort-value="0.84" | 840 m || 
|-id=281 bgcolor=#fefefe
| 448281 ||  || — || December 31, 2008 || XuYi || PMO NEO || — || align=right data-sort-value="0.79" | 790 m || 
|-id=282 bgcolor=#E9E9E9
| 448282 ||  || — || November 24, 2008 || Mount Lemmon || Mount Lemmon Survey || — || align=right | 1.8 km || 
|-id=283 bgcolor=#fefefe
| 448283 ||  || — || December 22, 2008 || Kitt Peak || Spacewatch || — || align=right data-sort-value="0.78" | 780 m || 
|-id=284 bgcolor=#d6d6d6
| 448284 ||  || — || January 1, 2009 || Kitt Peak || Spacewatch || 3:2 || align=right | 3.9 km || 
|-id=285 bgcolor=#fefefe
| 448285 ||  || — || December 22, 2008 || Kitt Peak || Spacewatch || MAS || align=right data-sort-value="0.59" | 590 m || 
|-id=286 bgcolor=#fefefe
| 448286 ||  || — || January 2, 2009 || Mount Lemmon || Mount Lemmon Survey || NYS || align=right data-sort-value="0.72" | 720 m || 
|-id=287 bgcolor=#fefefe
| 448287 ||  || — || January 3, 2009 || Kitt Peak || Spacewatch || MAS || align=right data-sort-value="0.57" | 570 m || 
|-id=288 bgcolor=#fefefe
| 448288 ||  || — || November 24, 2008 || Mount Lemmon || Mount Lemmon Survey || — || align=right data-sort-value="0.86" | 860 m || 
|-id=289 bgcolor=#fefefe
| 448289 ||  || — || January 8, 2009 || Kitt Peak || Spacewatch || — || align=right | 1.0 km || 
|-id=290 bgcolor=#fefefe
| 448290 ||  || — || January 18, 2009 || Catalina || CSS || — || align=right | 1.1 km || 
|-id=291 bgcolor=#E9E9E9
| 448291 ||  || — || January 27, 2009 || Socorro || LINEAR || — || align=right | 1.4 km || 
|-id=292 bgcolor=#fefefe
| 448292 ||  || — || January 24, 2009 || Calar Alto || F. Hormuth || (5026) || align=right data-sort-value="0.62" | 620 m || 
|-id=293 bgcolor=#fefefe
| 448293 ||  || — || December 30, 2008 || Kitt Peak || Spacewatch || — || align=right data-sort-value="0.65" | 650 m || 
|-id=294 bgcolor=#fefefe
| 448294 ||  || — || January 16, 2009 || Mount Lemmon || Mount Lemmon Survey || — || align=right data-sort-value="0.68" | 680 m || 
|-id=295 bgcolor=#fefefe
| 448295 ||  || — || January 17, 2009 || Kitt Peak || Spacewatch || — || align=right | 1.0 km || 
|-id=296 bgcolor=#fefefe
| 448296 ||  || — || January 2, 2009 || Kitt Peak || Spacewatch || NYS || align=right data-sort-value="0.60" | 600 m || 
|-id=297 bgcolor=#E9E9E9
| 448297 ||  || — || January 16, 2009 || Kitt Peak || Spacewatch || — || align=right data-sort-value="0.79" | 790 m || 
|-id=298 bgcolor=#fefefe
| 448298 ||  || — || January 16, 2009 || Kitt Peak || Spacewatch || — || align=right data-sort-value="0.78" | 780 m || 
|-id=299 bgcolor=#fefefe
| 448299 ||  || — || January 16, 2009 || Kitt Peak || Spacewatch || NYS || align=right data-sort-value="0.58" | 580 m || 
|-id=300 bgcolor=#fefefe
| 448300 ||  || — || January 17, 2009 || Mount Lemmon || Mount Lemmon Survey || (2076) || align=right data-sort-value="0.84" | 840 m || 
|}

448301–448400 

|-bgcolor=#E9E9E9
| 448301 ||  || — || January 18, 2009 || Kitt Peak || Spacewatch || EUN || align=right | 1.2 km || 
|-id=302 bgcolor=#E9E9E9
| 448302 ||  || — || January 28, 2009 || Dauban || F. Kugel || — || align=right | 1.1 km || 
|-id=303 bgcolor=#fefefe
| 448303 ||  || — || December 1, 2008 || Mount Lemmon || Mount Lemmon Survey || — || align=right data-sort-value="0.94" | 940 m || 
|-id=304 bgcolor=#fefefe
| 448304 ||  || — || January 26, 2009 || Mount Lemmon || Mount Lemmon Survey || NYS || align=right data-sort-value="0.83" | 830 m || 
|-id=305 bgcolor=#fefefe
| 448305 ||  || — || January 20, 2009 || Catalina || CSS || — || align=right | 1.0 km || 
|-id=306 bgcolor=#fefefe
| 448306 ||  || — || January 15, 2009 || Kitt Peak || Spacewatch || — || align=right data-sort-value="0.75" | 750 m || 
|-id=307 bgcolor=#fefefe
| 448307 ||  || — || October 23, 2004 || Kitt Peak || Spacewatch || — || align=right data-sort-value="0.80" | 800 m || 
|-id=308 bgcolor=#E9E9E9
| 448308 ||  || — || January 29, 2009 || Kitt Peak || Spacewatch || — || align=right data-sort-value="0.66" | 660 m || 
|-id=309 bgcolor=#fefefe
| 448309 ||  || — || January 30, 2009 || Kitt Peak || Spacewatch || — || align=right data-sort-value="0.86" | 860 m || 
|-id=310 bgcolor=#E9E9E9
| 448310 ||  || — || January 30, 2009 || Kitt Peak || Spacewatch || — || align=right | 1.1 km || 
|-id=311 bgcolor=#E9E9E9
| 448311 ||  || — || January 31, 2009 || Kitt Peak || Spacewatch || — || align=right | 1.2 km || 
|-id=312 bgcolor=#fefefe
| 448312 ||  || — || January 20, 2009 || Kitt Peak || Spacewatch || — || align=right data-sort-value="0.92" | 920 m || 
|-id=313 bgcolor=#fefefe
| 448313 ||  || — || January 20, 2009 || Socorro || LINEAR || — || align=right data-sort-value="0.93" | 930 m || 
|-id=314 bgcolor=#E9E9E9
| 448314 ||  || — || January 28, 2009 || Catalina || CSS || BRG || align=right | 1.8 km || 
|-id=315 bgcolor=#fefefe
| 448315 ||  || — || February 3, 2009 || Socorro || LINEAR || H || align=right data-sort-value="0.90" | 900 m || 
|-id=316 bgcolor=#fefefe
| 448316 ||  || — || October 7, 1996 || Kitt Peak || Spacewatch || MAS || align=right data-sort-value="0.77" | 770 m || 
|-id=317 bgcolor=#fefefe
| 448317 ||  || — || January 19, 2009 || Mount Lemmon || Mount Lemmon Survey || — || align=right data-sort-value="0.87" | 870 m || 
|-id=318 bgcolor=#E9E9E9
| 448318 ||  || — || February 4, 2009 || Mount Lemmon || Mount Lemmon Survey || — || align=right data-sort-value="0.92" | 920 m || 
|-id=319 bgcolor=#E9E9E9
| 448319 ||  || — || January 24, 2009 || XuYi || PMO NEO || — || align=right | 1.3 km || 
|-id=320 bgcolor=#fefefe
| 448320 ||  || — || January 18, 2009 || Kitt Peak || Spacewatch || — || align=right data-sort-value="0.70" | 700 m || 
|-id=321 bgcolor=#fefefe
| 448321 ||  || — || February 22, 2009 || Kitt Peak || Spacewatch || MAS || align=right data-sort-value="0.68" | 680 m || 
|-id=322 bgcolor=#E9E9E9
| 448322 ||  || — || February 22, 2009 || Kitt Peak || Spacewatch || — || align=right | 1.3 km || 
|-id=323 bgcolor=#E9E9E9
| 448323 ||  || — || February 22, 2009 || Kitt Peak || Spacewatch || — || align=right data-sort-value="0.91" | 910 m || 
|-id=324 bgcolor=#E9E9E9
| 448324 ||  || — || February 3, 2009 || Kitt Peak || Spacewatch || — || align=right data-sort-value="0.87" | 870 m || 
|-id=325 bgcolor=#E9E9E9
| 448325 ||  || — || February 22, 2009 || Mount Lemmon || Mount Lemmon Survey || (5) || align=right data-sort-value="0.70" | 700 m || 
|-id=326 bgcolor=#E9E9E9
| 448326 ||  || — || February 20, 2009 || Kitt Peak || Spacewatch || — || align=right data-sort-value="0.98" | 980 m || 
|-id=327 bgcolor=#E9E9E9
| 448327 ||  || — || February 21, 2009 || Catalina || CSS || — || align=right | 2.4 km || 
|-id=328 bgcolor=#fefefe
| 448328 ||  || — || January 29, 2009 || Catalina || CSS || — || align=right | 1.8 km || 
|-id=329 bgcolor=#E9E9E9
| 448329 ||  || — || February 19, 2009 || Kitt Peak || Spacewatch || — || align=right | 1.9 km || 
|-id=330 bgcolor=#E9E9E9
| 448330 ||  || — || February 26, 2009 || Catalina || CSS || — || align=right | 1.6 km || 
|-id=331 bgcolor=#E9E9E9
| 448331 ||  || — || February 20, 2009 || Socorro || LINEAR || — || align=right | 1.6 km || 
|-id=332 bgcolor=#E9E9E9
| 448332 ||  || — || February 26, 2009 || Kitt Peak || Spacewatch || — || align=right | 1.7 km || 
|-id=333 bgcolor=#fefefe
| 448333 ||  || — || January 29, 2009 || Mount Lemmon || Mount Lemmon Survey || H || align=right data-sort-value="0.54" | 540 m || 
|-id=334 bgcolor=#fefefe
| 448334 ||  || — || March 3, 2009 || Catalina || CSS || H || align=right data-sort-value="0.86" | 860 m || 
|-id=335 bgcolor=#E9E9E9
| 448335 ||  || — || March 3, 2009 || Kitt Peak || Spacewatch || — || align=right | 1.4 km || 
|-id=336 bgcolor=#E9E9E9
| 448336 ||  || — || March 17, 2009 || Kitt Peak || Spacewatch || — || align=right data-sort-value="0.79" | 790 m || 
|-id=337 bgcolor=#E9E9E9
| 448337 ||  || — || March 18, 2009 || La Sagra || OAM Obs. || — || align=right | 3.2 km || 
|-id=338 bgcolor=#E9E9E9
| 448338 ||  || — || March 20, 2009 || La Sagra || OAM Obs. || — || align=right | 3.3 km || 
|-id=339 bgcolor=#fefefe
| 448339 ||  || — || March 28, 2009 || Siding Spring || SSS || H || align=right data-sort-value="0.75" | 750 m || 
|-id=340 bgcolor=#E9E9E9
| 448340 ||  || — || March 18, 2009 || Catalina || CSS || EUN || align=right | 1.6 km || 
|-id=341 bgcolor=#fefefe
| 448341 ||  || — || March 19, 2009 || Kitt Peak || Spacewatch || H || align=right data-sort-value="0.87" | 870 m || 
|-id=342 bgcolor=#E9E9E9
| 448342 ||  || — || March 27, 2009 || Catalina || CSS || EUN || align=right | 1.5 km || 
|-id=343 bgcolor=#E9E9E9
| 448343 ||  || — || March 24, 2009 || Mount Lemmon || Mount Lemmon Survey || — || align=right | 1.6 km || 
|-id=344 bgcolor=#E9E9E9
| 448344 ||  || — || March 17, 2009 || Kitt Peak || Spacewatch || — || align=right | 1.9 km || 
|-id=345 bgcolor=#E9E9E9
| 448345 ||  || — || March 21, 2009 || Mount Lemmon || Mount Lemmon Survey || — || align=right data-sort-value="0.75" | 750 m || 
|-id=346 bgcolor=#E9E9E9
| 448346 ||  || — || March 26, 2009 || Kitt Peak || Spacewatch || — || align=right | 2.1 km || 
|-id=347 bgcolor=#E9E9E9
| 448347 ||  || — || March 26, 2009 || Kitt Peak || Spacewatch || — || align=right | 1.7 km || 
|-id=348 bgcolor=#E9E9E9
| 448348 ||  || — || March 31, 2009 || Kitt Peak || Spacewatch || — || align=right | 1.7 km || 
|-id=349 bgcolor=#fefefe
| 448349 ||  || — || March 19, 2009 || Mount Lemmon || Mount Lemmon Survey || H || align=right data-sort-value="0.64" | 640 m || 
|-id=350 bgcolor=#E9E9E9
| 448350 ||  || — || March 17, 2009 || Kitt Peak || Spacewatch || — || align=right | 1.8 km || 
|-id=351 bgcolor=#fefefe
| 448351 ||  || — || April 4, 2009 || Cerro Burek || Alianza S4 Obs. || H || align=right data-sort-value="0.86" | 860 m || 
|-id=352 bgcolor=#E9E9E9
| 448352 ||  || — || April 3, 2009 || Cerro Burek || Alianza S4 Obs. || — || align=right | 2.7 km || 
|-id=353 bgcolor=#E9E9E9
| 448353 ||  || — || February 20, 2009 || Mount Lemmon || Mount Lemmon Survey || — || align=right | 1.5 km || 
|-id=354 bgcolor=#E9E9E9
| 448354 ||  || — || March 24, 2009 || Mount Lemmon || Mount Lemmon Survey || — || align=right | 2.0 km || 
|-id=355 bgcolor=#E9E9E9
| 448355 ||  || — || March 31, 2009 || Kitt Peak || Spacewatch || GEF || align=right | 1.1 km || 
|-id=356 bgcolor=#E9E9E9
| 448356 ||  || — || March 16, 2009 || Kitt Peak || Spacewatch || — || align=right | 1.5 km || 
|-id=357 bgcolor=#E9E9E9
| 448357 ||  || — || March 28, 2009 || Kitt Peak || Spacewatch || — || align=right | 1.3 km || 
|-id=358 bgcolor=#E9E9E9
| 448358 ||  || — || March 31, 2009 || Kitt Peak || Spacewatch || — || align=right | 2.2 km || 
|-id=359 bgcolor=#fefefe
| 448359 ||  || — || March 23, 2009 || XuYi || PMO NEO || H || align=right data-sort-value="0.63" | 630 m || 
|-id=360 bgcolor=#E9E9E9
| 448360 ||  || — || March 17, 2009 || Kitt Peak || Spacewatch || — || align=right | 2.2 km || 
|-id=361 bgcolor=#E9E9E9
| 448361 ||  || — || April 20, 2009 || Kitt Peak || Spacewatch || — || align=right | 1.5 km || 
|-id=362 bgcolor=#E9E9E9
| 448362 ||  || — || March 18, 2009 || Kitt Peak || Spacewatch || — || align=right | 1.9 km || 
|-id=363 bgcolor=#E9E9E9
| 448363 ||  || — || April 19, 2009 || Kitt Peak || Spacewatch || EUN || align=right | 1.3 km || 
|-id=364 bgcolor=#E9E9E9
| 448364 ||  || — || April 21, 2009 || Kitt Peak || Spacewatch || — || align=right | 2.2 km || 
|-id=365 bgcolor=#d6d6d6
| 448365 ||  || — || February 19, 2009 || Kitt Peak || Spacewatch || — || align=right | 2.3 km || 
|-id=366 bgcolor=#fefefe
| 448366 ||  || — || April 26, 2009 || Catalina || CSS || H || align=right data-sort-value="0.72" | 720 m || 
|-id=367 bgcolor=#E9E9E9
| 448367 ||  || — || April 20, 2009 || Mount Lemmon || Mount Lemmon Survey || — || align=right | 1.4 km || 
|-id=368 bgcolor=#E9E9E9
| 448368 ||  || — || April 24, 2009 || Kitt Peak || Spacewatch || — || align=right | 1.6 km || 
|-id=369 bgcolor=#E9E9E9
| 448369 ||  || — || April 1, 2009 || Catalina || CSS || — || align=right | 1.9 km || 
|-id=370 bgcolor=#E9E9E9
| 448370 ||  || — || April 19, 2009 || Kitt Peak || Spacewatch || — || align=right | 2.3 km || 
|-id=371 bgcolor=#E9E9E9
| 448371 ||  || — || May 15, 2009 || La Sagra || OAM Obs. || — || align=right | 1.7 km || 
|-id=372 bgcolor=#fefefe
| 448372 ||  || — || May 18, 2009 || La Sagra || OAM Obs. || H || align=right data-sort-value="0.84" | 840 m || 
|-id=373 bgcolor=#d6d6d6
| 448373 ||  || — || May 24, 2009 || Kitt Peak || Spacewatch || Tj (2.99) || align=right | 4.2 km || 
|-id=374 bgcolor=#E9E9E9
| 448374 ||  || — || April 24, 2009 || Kitt Peak || Spacewatch || — || align=right | 1.5 km || 
|-id=375 bgcolor=#d6d6d6
| 448375 ||  || — || May 25, 2009 || Kitt Peak || Spacewatch || — || align=right | 2.5 km || 
|-id=376 bgcolor=#fefefe
| 448376 ||  || — || May 26, 2009 || Kitt Peak || Spacewatch || H || align=right data-sort-value="0.50" | 500 m || 
|-id=377 bgcolor=#E9E9E9
| 448377 ||  || — || May 1, 2009 || Kitt Peak || Spacewatch || — || align=right | 2.0 km || 
|-id=378 bgcolor=#d6d6d6
| 448378 ||  || — || May 1, 2009 || Mount Lemmon || Mount Lemmon Survey || — || align=right | 2.8 km || 
|-id=379 bgcolor=#d6d6d6
| 448379 ||  || — || June 12, 2009 || Kitt Peak || Spacewatch || — || align=right | 2.2 km || 
|-id=380 bgcolor=#E9E9E9
| 448380 ||  || — || June 12, 2009 || Kitt Peak || Spacewatch || — || align=right | 3.2 km || 
|-id=381 bgcolor=#d6d6d6
| 448381 ||  || — || May 28, 2008 || Kitt Peak || Spacewatch || — || align=right | 3.5 km || 
|-id=382 bgcolor=#d6d6d6
| 448382 ||  || — || June 21, 2009 || Mount Lemmon || Mount Lemmon Survey || — || align=right | 2.9 km || 
|-id=383 bgcolor=#d6d6d6
| 448383 ||  || — || July 28, 2009 || Catalina || CSS || — || align=right | 3.5 km || 
|-id=384 bgcolor=#d6d6d6
| 448384 ||  || — || July 29, 2009 || Catalina || CSS || — || align=right | 4.5 km || 
|-id=385 bgcolor=#d6d6d6
| 448385 ||  || — || August 15, 2009 || Catalina || CSS || — || align=right | 5.3 km || 
|-id=386 bgcolor=#d6d6d6
| 448386 ||  || — || August 1, 2009 || Kitt Peak || Spacewatch || — || align=right | 2.4 km || 
|-id=387 bgcolor=#d6d6d6
| 448387 ||  || — || August 15, 2009 || Catalina || CSS || — || align=right | 4.1 km || 
|-id=388 bgcolor=#d6d6d6
| 448388 ||  || — || August 18, 2009 || Bergisch Gladbach || W. Bickel || — || align=right | 2.5 km || 
|-id=389 bgcolor=#d6d6d6
| 448389 ||  || — || August 16, 2009 || Kitt Peak || Spacewatch || EOS || align=right | 2.3 km || 
|-id=390 bgcolor=#d6d6d6
| 448390 ||  || — || August 16, 2009 || Kitt Peak || Spacewatch || — || align=right | 3.1 km || 
|-id=391 bgcolor=#d6d6d6
| 448391 ||  || — || August 17, 2009 || Kitt Peak || Spacewatch || — || align=right | 3.4 km || 
|-id=392 bgcolor=#d6d6d6
| 448392 ||  || — || August 18, 2009 || Kitt Peak || Spacewatch || — || align=right | 2.9 km || 
|-id=393 bgcolor=#d6d6d6
| 448393 ||  || — || July 14, 2009 || Kitt Peak || Spacewatch || — || align=right | 2.7 km || 
|-id=394 bgcolor=#d6d6d6
| 448394 ||  || — || August 15, 2009 || Kitt Peak || Spacewatch || — || align=right | 2.7 km || 
|-id=395 bgcolor=#d6d6d6
| 448395 ||  || — || August 28, 2009 || La Sagra || OAM Obs. || — || align=right | 2.6 km || 
|-id=396 bgcolor=#d6d6d6
| 448396 ||  || — || August 28, 2009 || La Sagra || OAM Obs. || — || align=right | 3.6 km || 
|-id=397 bgcolor=#d6d6d6
| 448397 ||  || — || January 30, 2008 || Mount Lemmon || Mount Lemmon Survey || — || align=right | 3.7 km || 
|-id=398 bgcolor=#d6d6d6
| 448398 ||  || — || September 10, 2009 || La Sagra || OAM Obs. || — || align=right | 3.2 km || 
|-id=399 bgcolor=#d6d6d6
| 448399 ||  || — || September 12, 2009 || Kitt Peak || Spacewatch || — || align=right | 2.9 km || 
|-id=400 bgcolor=#d6d6d6
| 448400 ||  || — || September 12, 2009 || Kitt Peak || Spacewatch || — || align=right | 2.8 km || 
|}

448401–448500 

|-bgcolor=#d6d6d6
| 448401 ||  || — || September 12, 2009 || Kitt Peak || Spacewatch || — || align=right | 2.5 km || 
|-id=402 bgcolor=#fefefe
| 448402 ||  || — || May 30, 2009 || Mount Lemmon || Mount Lemmon Survey || — || align=right data-sort-value="0.80" | 800 m || 
|-id=403 bgcolor=#d6d6d6
| 448403 ||  || — || September 15, 2009 || Siding Spring || SSS || — || align=right | 4.1 km || 
|-id=404 bgcolor=#d6d6d6
| 448404 ||  || — || September 15, 2009 || Kitt Peak || Spacewatch || — || align=right | 3.0 km || 
|-id=405 bgcolor=#d6d6d6
| 448405 ||  || — || September 15, 2009 || Kitt Peak || Spacewatch || — || align=right | 3.4 km || 
|-id=406 bgcolor=#d6d6d6
| 448406 ||  || — || September 16, 2009 || Kitt Peak || Spacewatch || — || align=right | 2.4 km || 
|-id=407 bgcolor=#d6d6d6
| 448407 ||  || — || August 17, 2009 || Catalina || CSS || — || align=right | 3.8 km || 
|-id=408 bgcolor=#d6d6d6
| 448408 ||  || — || August 29, 2009 || Catalina || CSS || — || align=right | 2.7 km || 
|-id=409 bgcolor=#d6d6d6
| 448409 ||  || — || March 13, 2007 || Kitt Peak || Spacewatch || — || align=right | 3.4 km || 
|-id=410 bgcolor=#d6d6d6
| 448410 ||  || — || September 17, 2009 || Kitt Peak || Spacewatch || — || align=right | 3.0 km || 
|-id=411 bgcolor=#d6d6d6
| 448411 ||  || — || August 27, 2009 || Kitt Peak || Spacewatch || — || align=right | 2.3 km || 
|-id=412 bgcolor=#d6d6d6
| 448412 ||  || — || September 17, 2009 || Kitt Peak || Spacewatch || LIX || align=right | 3.5 km || 
|-id=413 bgcolor=#d6d6d6
| 448413 ||  || — || September 18, 2009 || Kitt Peak || Spacewatch || critical || align=right | 2.4 km || 
|-id=414 bgcolor=#d6d6d6
| 448414 ||  || — || March 13, 2007 || Mount Lemmon || Mount Lemmon Survey || — || align=right | 3.1 km || 
|-id=415 bgcolor=#d6d6d6
| 448415 ||  || — || September 19, 2009 || Kitt Peak || Spacewatch || — || align=right | 3.5 km || 
|-id=416 bgcolor=#d6d6d6
| 448416 ||  || — || August 17, 2009 || Catalina || CSS || — || align=right | 2.4 km || 
|-id=417 bgcolor=#d6d6d6
| 448417 ||  || — || September 20, 2009 || Kitt Peak || Spacewatch || — || align=right | 2.8 km || 
|-id=418 bgcolor=#d6d6d6
| 448418 ||  || — || August 29, 2009 || Kitt Peak || Spacewatch || — || align=right | 3.5 km || 
|-id=419 bgcolor=#d6d6d6
| 448419 ||  || — || December 10, 2004 || Socorro || LINEAR || — || align=right | 4.2 km || 
|-id=420 bgcolor=#d6d6d6
| 448420 ||  || — || September 25, 2009 || La Sagra || OAM Obs. || — || align=right | 4.4 km || 
|-id=421 bgcolor=#d6d6d6
| 448421 ||  || — || April 6, 2008 || Kitt Peak || Spacewatch || — || align=right | 3.6 km || 
|-id=422 bgcolor=#d6d6d6
| 448422 ||  || — || September 16, 2009 || Siding Spring || SSS || — || align=right | 3.9 km || 
|-id=423 bgcolor=#d6d6d6
| 448423 ||  || — || September 24, 2009 || Kitt Peak || Spacewatch || — || align=right | 4.5 km || 
|-id=424 bgcolor=#d6d6d6
| 448424 ||  || — || September 25, 2009 || Kitt Peak || Spacewatch || — || align=right | 3.8 km || 
|-id=425 bgcolor=#d6d6d6
| 448425 ||  || — || September 17, 2009 || Kitt Peak || Spacewatch || — || align=right | 3.4 km || 
|-id=426 bgcolor=#d6d6d6
| 448426 ||  || — || September 25, 2009 || Kitt Peak || Spacewatch || — || align=right | 2.8 km || 
|-id=427 bgcolor=#fefefe
| 448427 ||  || — || October 22, 2009 || Mount Lemmon || Mount Lemmon Survey || critical || align=right data-sort-value="0.54" | 540 m || 
|-id=428 bgcolor=#fefefe
| 448428 ||  || — || October 22, 2009 || Catalina || CSS || — || align=right data-sort-value="0.82" | 820 m || 
|-id=429 bgcolor=#d6d6d6
| 448429 ||  || — || October 25, 2009 || Kitt Peak || Spacewatch || 7:4 || align=right | 3.2 km || 
|-id=430 bgcolor=#d6d6d6
| 448430 ||  || — || October 21, 2009 || Mount Lemmon || Mount Lemmon Survey || VER || align=right | 2.7 km || 
|-id=431 bgcolor=#d6d6d6
| 448431 ||  || — || November 10, 2009 || Catalina || CSS || Tj (2.98) || align=right | 4.9 km || 
|-id=432 bgcolor=#d6d6d6
| 448432 ||  || — || November 11, 2009 || Socorro || LINEAR || 7:4 || align=right | 4.2 km || 
|-id=433 bgcolor=#d6d6d6
| 448433 ||  || — || October 11, 2009 || Mount Lemmon || Mount Lemmon Survey || — || align=right | 2.9 km || 
|-id=434 bgcolor=#fefefe
| 448434 ||  || — || October 25, 2009 || Kitt Peak || Spacewatch || — || align=right data-sort-value="0.64" | 640 m || 
|-id=435 bgcolor=#fefefe
| 448435 ||  || — || November 10, 2009 || Kitt Peak || Spacewatch || — || align=right data-sort-value="0.64" | 640 m || 
|-id=436 bgcolor=#fefefe
| 448436 ||  || — || November 19, 2009 || Kitt Peak || Spacewatch || — || align=right data-sort-value="0.60" | 600 m || 
|-id=437 bgcolor=#d6d6d6
| 448437 ||  || — || November 19, 2009 || Kitt Peak || Spacewatch || 7:4 || align=right | 3.1 km || 
|-id=438 bgcolor=#d6d6d6
| 448438 ||  || — || September 20, 2009 || Kitt Peak || Spacewatch || — || align=right | 2.8 km || 
|-id=439 bgcolor=#fefefe
| 448439 ||  || — || November 11, 2009 || Kitt Peak || Spacewatch || — || align=right data-sort-value="0.74" | 740 m || 
|-id=440 bgcolor=#fefefe
| 448440 ||  || — || October 23, 2009 || Kitt Peak || Spacewatch || — || align=right data-sort-value="0.63" | 630 m || 
|-id=441 bgcolor=#fefefe
| 448441 ||  || — || November 21, 2009 || Mount Lemmon || Mount Lemmon Survey || — || align=right data-sort-value="0.83" | 830 m || 
|-id=442 bgcolor=#fefefe
| 448442 ||  || — || November 17, 2009 || Mount Lemmon || Mount Lemmon Survey || — || align=right data-sort-value="0.87" | 870 m || 
|-id=443 bgcolor=#FA8072
| 448443 ||  || — || December 17, 2009 || Mount Lemmon || Mount Lemmon Survey || — || align=right data-sort-value="0.59" | 590 m || 
|-id=444 bgcolor=#d6d6d6
| 448444 ||  || — || September 30, 2009 || Mount Lemmon || Mount Lemmon Survey || Tj (2.99) || align=right | 3.5 km || 
|-id=445 bgcolor=#E9E9E9
| 448445 ||  || — || December 4, 2008 || Kitt Peak || Spacewatch || — || align=right | 2.7 km || 
|-id=446 bgcolor=#fefefe
| 448446 ||  || — || February 15, 2010 || Haleakala || Pan-STARRS || — || align=right data-sort-value="0.87" | 870 m || 
|-id=447 bgcolor=#fefefe
| 448447 ||  || — || September 11, 2004 || Kitt Peak || Spacewatch || V || align=right data-sort-value="0.77" | 770 m || 
|-id=448 bgcolor=#E9E9E9
| 448448 ||  || — || February 24, 2010 || WISE || WISE || critical || align=right | 2.0 km || 
|-id=449 bgcolor=#fefefe
| 448449 ||  || — || September 6, 2008 || Kitt Peak || Spacewatch || — || align=right data-sort-value="0.66" | 660 m || 
|-id=450 bgcolor=#fefefe
| 448450 ||  || — || February 17, 2010 || Catalina || CSS || — || align=right | 1.2 km || 
|-id=451 bgcolor=#fefefe
| 448451 ||  || — || February 16, 2010 || Mount Lemmon || Mount Lemmon Survey || — || align=right | 2.7 km || 
|-id=452 bgcolor=#fefefe
| 448452 ||  || — || March 5, 2010 || Catalina || CSS || — || align=right | 2.2 km || 
|-id=453 bgcolor=#fefefe
| 448453 ||  || — || March 13, 2010 || Dauban || F. Kugel || — || align=right | 1.0 km || 
|-id=454 bgcolor=#E9E9E9
| 448454 ||  || — || March 12, 2010 || Kitt Peak || Spacewatch || — || align=right | 1.2 km || 
|-id=455 bgcolor=#fefefe
| 448455 ||  || — || March 4, 2010 || Kitt Peak || Spacewatch || MAS || align=right data-sort-value="0.71" | 710 m || 
|-id=456 bgcolor=#fefefe
| 448456 ||  || — || September 23, 2008 || Mount Lemmon || Mount Lemmon Survey || — || align=right data-sort-value="0.71" | 710 m || 
|-id=457 bgcolor=#fefefe
| 448457 ||  || — || March 13, 2010 || Kitt Peak || Spacewatch || — || align=right data-sort-value="0.73" | 730 m || 
|-id=458 bgcolor=#fefefe
| 448458 ||  || — || March 13, 2010 || Kitt Peak || Spacewatch || NYS || align=right data-sort-value="0.69" | 690 m || 
|-id=459 bgcolor=#fefefe
| 448459 ||  || — || March 12, 2010 || Mount Lemmon || Mount Lemmon Survey || V || align=right data-sort-value="0.81" | 810 m || 
|-id=460 bgcolor=#fefefe
| 448460 ||  || — || March 4, 2010 || Kitt Peak || Spacewatch || — || align=right data-sort-value="0.76" | 760 m || 
|-id=461 bgcolor=#fefefe
| 448461 ||  || — || March 12, 2010 || Kitt Peak || Spacewatch || — || align=right data-sort-value="0.92" | 920 m || 
|-id=462 bgcolor=#E9E9E9
| 448462 ||  || — || March 12, 2010 || Kitt Peak || Spacewatch || — || align=right data-sort-value="0.98" | 980 m || 
|-id=463 bgcolor=#fefefe
| 448463 ||  || — || March 13, 2010 || Kitt Peak || Spacewatch || — || align=right data-sort-value="0.74" | 740 m || 
|-id=464 bgcolor=#fefefe
| 448464 ||  || — || March 15, 2010 || Mount Lemmon || Mount Lemmon Survey || — || align=right | 2.7 km || 
|-id=465 bgcolor=#E9E9E9
| 448465 ||  || — || March 13, 2010 || Mount Lemmon || Mount Lemmon Survey || — || align=right | 1.0 km || 
|-id=466 bgcolor=#E9E9E9
| 448466 ||  || — || May 21, 2006 || Kitt Peak || Spacewatch || — || align=right | 1.2 km || 
|-id=467 bgcolor=#fefefe
| 448467 ||  || — || March 16, 2010 || Kitt Peak || Spacewatch || MAS || align=right data-sort-value="0.76" | 760 m || 
|-id=468 bgcolor=#fefefe
| 448468 ||  || — || March 16, 2010 || Kitt Peak || Spacewatch || MAS || align=right data-sort-value="0.70" | 700 m || 
|-id=469 bgcolor=#fefefe
| 448469 ||  || — || February 18, 2010 || Mount Lemmon || Mount Lemmon Survey || — || align=right data-sort-value="0.78" | 780 m || 
|-id=470 bgcolor=#E9E9E9
| 448470 ||  || — || September 19, 2007 || Kitt Peak || Spacewatch || — || align=right | 1.0 km || 
|-id=471 bgcolor=#fefefe
| 448471 ||  || — || April 6, 2010 || Kitt Peak || Spacewatch || — || align=right | 2.2 km || 
|-id=472 bgcolor=#fefefe
| 448472 ||  || — || April 8, 2010 || Mount Lemmon || Mount Lemmon Survey || — || align=right data-sort-value="0.97" | 970 m || 
|-id=473 bgcolor=#fefefe
| 448473 ||  || — || April 4, 2010 || Kitt Peak || Spacewatch || — || align=right data-sort-value="0.71" | 710 m || 
|-id=474 bgcolor=#fefefe
| 448474 ||  || — || January 22, 2006 || Catalina || CSS || — || align=right | 1.0 km || 
|-id=475 bgcolor=#fefefe
| 448475 ||  || — || March 18, 2010 || Kitt Peak || Spacewatch || — || align=right data-sort-value="0.89" | 890 m || 
|-id=476 bgcolor=#E9E9E9
| 448476 ||  || — || April 6, 2010 || Kitt Peak || Spacewatch || EUN || align=right | 1.0 km || 
|-id=477 bgcolor=#fefefe
| 448477 ||  || — || April 8, 2010 || Kitt Peak || Spacewatch || — || align=right data-sort-value="0.62" | 620 m || 
|-id=478 bgcolor=#E9E9E9
| 448478 ||  || — || April 10, 2010 || Kitt Peak || Spacewatch || — || align=right | 1.9 km || 
|-id=479 bgcolor=#E9E9E9
| 448479 ||  || — || April 11, 2010 || Mount Lemmon || Mount Lemmon Survey || — || align=right | 1.2 km || 
|-id=480 bgcolor=#fefefe
| 448480 ||  || — || March 12, 2010 || Kitt Peak || Spacewatch || V || align=right data-sort-value="0.60" | 600 m || 
|-id=481 bgcolor=#E9E9E9
| 448481 ||  || — || September 10, 2007 || Mount Lemmon || Mount Lemmon Survey || — || align=right | 1.6 km || 
|-id=482 bgcolor=#E9E9E9
| 448482 ||  || — || April 25, 2010 || WISE || WISE || — || align=right | 2.1 km || 
|-id=483 bgcolor=#E9E9E9
| 448483 ||  || — || May 7, 2010 || Kitt Peak || Spacewatch || (5) || align=right data-sort-value="0.78" | 780 m || 
|-id=484 bgcolor=#E9E9E9
| 448484 ||  || — || May 9, 2010 || WISE || WISE || — || align=right | 3.5 km || 
|-id=485 bgcolor=#E9E9E9
| 448485 ||  || — || November 16, 2003 || Kitt Peak || Spacewatch || — || align=right data-sort-value="0.98" | 980 m || 
|-id=486 bgcolor=#fefefe
| 448486 ||  || — || May 8, 2010 || Mount Lemmon || Mount Lemmon Survey || NYS || align=right data-sort-value="0.73" | 730 m || 
|-id=487 bgcolor=#E9E9E9
| 448487 ||  || — || May 4, 2010 || Kitt Peak || Spacewatch || — || align=right | 1.3 km || 
|-id=488 bgcolor=#E9E9E9
| 448488 ||  || — || November 7, 2007 || Kitt Peak || Spacewatch || AEO || align=right | 1.3 km || 
|-id=489 bgcolor=#E9E9E9
| 448489 ||  || — || April 9, 2010 || Mount Lemmon || Mount Lemmon Survey || — || align=right | 1.2 km || 
|-id=490 bgcolor=#E9E9E9
| 448490 ||  || — || November 4, 2007 || Kitt Peak || Spacewatch || — || align=right | 1.5 km || 
|-id=491 bgcolor=#E9E9E9
| 448491 ||  || — || May 14, 2010 || WISE || WISE || — || align=right | 3.3 km || 
|-id=492 bgcolor=#E9E9E9
| 448492 ||  || — || April 9, 2010 || Kitt Peak || Spacewatch || — || align=right | 2.1 km || 
|-id=493 bgcolor=#E9E9E9
| 448493 ||  || — || November 18, 2003 || Kitt Peak || Spacewatch || — || align=right | 1.8 km || 
|-id=494 bgcolor=#E9E9E9
| 448494 ||  || — || May 13, 2010 || Kitt Peak || Spacewatch || MAR || align=right | 1.0 km || 
|-id=495 bgcolor=#E9E9E9
| 448495 ||  || — || May 22, 2010 || WISE || WISE || — || align=right | 1.8 km || 
|-id=496 bgcolor=#E9E9E9
| 448496 ||  || — || May 31, 2010 || WISE || WISE || — || align=right | 2.2 km || 
|-id=497 bgcolor=#E9E9E9
| 448497 ||  || — || May 19, 2010 || Catalina || CSS || — || align=right | 1.2 km || 
|-id=498 bgcolor=#E9E9E9
| 448498 ||  || — || June 6, 2010 || WISE || WISE || — || align=right | 1.9 km || 
|-id=499 bgcolor=#fefefe
| 448499 ||  || — || May 11, 2010 || Mount Lemmon || Mount Lemmon Survey || — || align=right | 1.1 km || 
|-id=500 bgcolor=#E9E9E9
| 448500 ||  || — || June 10, 2010 || WISE || WISE || — || align=right | 2.8 km || 
|}

448501–448600 

|-bgcolor=#E9E9E9
| 448501 ||  || — || June 11, 2010 || WISE || WISE || — || align=right | 2.8 km || 
|-id=502 bgcolor=#E9E9E9
| 448502 ||  || — || February 23, 2010 || WISE || WISE || — || align=right | 3.0 km || 
|-id=503 bgcolor=#E9E9E9
| 448503 ||  || — || June 14, 2010 || WISE || WISE || DOR || align=right | 2.7 km || 
|-id=504 bgcolor=#d6d6d6
| 448504 ||  || — || June 14, 2010 || WISE || WISE || — || align=right | 3.1 km || 
|-id=505 bgcolor=#E9E9E9
| 448505 ||  || — || June 20, 2010 || Mount Lemmon || Mount Lemmon Survey || — || align=right | 2.1 km || 
|-id=506 bgcolor=#d6d6d6
| 448506 ||  || — || June 23, 2010 || WISE || WISE || — || align=right | 2.4 km || 
|-id=507 bgcolor=#E9E9E9
| 448507 ||  || — || June 27, 2010 || WISE || WISE || HOF || align=right | 2.7 km || 
|-id=508 bgcolor=#d6d6d6
| 448508 ||  || — || June 27, 2010 || WISE || WISE || — || align=right | 3.4 km || 
|-id=509 bgcolor=#d6d6d6
| 448509 ||  || — || June 29, 2010 || WISE || WISE || EOS || align=right | 3.1 km || 
|-id=510 bgcolor=#d6d6d6
| 448510 ||  || — || June 29, 2010 || WISE || WISE || — || align=right | 3.8 km || 
|-id=511 bgcolor=#d6d6d6
| 448511 ||  || — || July 2, 2010 || WISE || WISE || — || align=right | 3.4 km || 
|-id=512 bgcolor=#d6d6d6
| 448512 ||  || — || October 7, 2005 || Kitt Peak || Spacewatch || — || align=right | 2.6 km || 
|-id=513 bgcolor=#E9E9E9
| 448513 ||  || — || July 9, 2010 || WISE || WISE || — || align=right | 1.7 km || 
|-id=514 bgcolor=#d6d6d6
| 448514 ||  || — || July 9, 2010 || WISE || WISE || — || align=right | 2.8 km || 
|-id=515 bgcolor=#d6d6d6
| 448515 ||  || — || July 10, 2010 || WISE || WISE || — || align=right | 2.6 km || 
|-id=516 bgcolor=#d6d6d6
| 448516 ||  || — || July 16, 2010 || WISE || WISE || — || align=right | 3.0 km || 
|-id=517 bgcolor=#d6d6d6
| 448517 ||  || — || July 17, 2010 || WISE || WISE || HYG || align=right | 2.7 km || 
|-id=518 bgcolor=#d6d6d6
| 448518 ||  || — || July 17, 2010 || WISE || WISE || Tj (2.99) || align=right | 4.4 km || 
|-id=519 bgcolor=#d6d6d6
| 448519 ||  || — || July 18, 2010 || WISE || WISE || — || align=right | 4.0 km || 
|-id=520 bgcolor=#d6d6d6
| 448520 ||  || — || July 21, 2010 || WISE || WISE || EMA || align=right | 3.4 km || 
|-id=521 bgcolor=#d6d6d6
| 448521 ||  || — || July 22, 2010 || WISE || WISE || — || align=right | 2.1 km || 
|-id=522 bgcolor=#d6d6d6
| 448522 ||  || — || April 4, 2008 || Mount Lemmon || Mount Lemmon Survey || — || align=right | 3.5 km || 
|-id=523 bgcolor=#d6d6d6
| 448523 ||  || — || July 23, 2010 || WISE || WISE || — || align=right | 3.2 km || 
|-id=524 bgcolor=#d6d6d6
| 448524 ||  || — || July 25, 2010 || WISE || WISE || — || align=right | 4.7 km || 
|-id=525 bgcolor=#d6d6d6
| 448525 ||  || — || July 27, 2010 || WISE || WISE || — || align=right | 4.5 km || 
|-id=526 bgcolor=#d6d6d6
| 448526 ||  || — || October 10, 2005 || Kitt Peak || Spacewatch || TRE || align=right | 2.7 km || 
|-id=527 bgcolor=#d6d6d6
| 448527 ||  || — || October 8, 2004 || Kitt Peak || Spacewatch || — || align=right | 3.1 km || 
|-id=528 bgcolor=#d6d6d6
| 448528 ||  || — || November 18, 2006 || Mount Lemmon || Mount Lemmon Survey || — || align=right | 3.6 km || 
|-id=529 bgcolor=#d6d6d6
| 448529 ||  || — || July 30, 2010 || WISE || WISE || — || align=right | 2.8 km || 
|-id=530 bgcolor=#E9E9E9
| 448530 ||  || — || August 2, 2010 || Socorro || LINEAR || — || align=right | 2.3 km || 
|-id=531 bgcolor=#E9E9E9
| 448531 ||  || — || August 4, 2010 || Socorro || LINEAR || — || align=right | 2.9 km || 
|-id=532 bgcolor=#E9E9E9
| 448532 ||  || — || August 4, 2010 || Socorro || LINEAR || — || align=right | 2.4 km || 
|-id=533 bgcolor=#E9E9E9
| 448533 ||  || — || January 3, 2009 || Kitt Peak || Spacewatch || — || align=right | 2.7 km || 
|-id=534 bgcolor=#d6d6d6
| 448534 ||  || — || December 21, 2006 || Mount Lemmon || Mount Lemmon Survey || — || align=right | 2.4 km || 
|-id=535 bgcolor=#d6d6d6
| 448535 ||  || — || August 6, 2010 || WISE || WISE || — || align=right | 3.9 km || 
|-id=536 bgcolor=#d6d6d6
| 448536 ||  || — || August 8, 2010 || WISE || WISE || — || align=right | 4.3 km || 
|-id=537 bgcolor=#E9E9E9
| 448537 ||  || — || August 10, 2010 || Kitt Peak || Spacewatch || — || align=right | 1.9 km || 
|-id=538 bgcolor=#d6d6d6
| 448538 ||  || — || August 9, 2010 || WISE || WISE || — || align=right | 3.2 km || 
|-id=539 bgcolor=#d6d6d6
| 448539 ||  || — || August 10, 2010 || WISE || WISE || — || align=right | 3.9 km || 
|-id=540 bgcolor=#E9E9E9
| 448540 ||  || — || June 8, 2005 || Kitt Peak || Spacewatch || — || align=right | 2.5 km || 
|-id=541 bgcolor=#E9E9E9
| 448541 ||  || — || March 27, 2008 || Mount Lemmon || Mount Lemmon Survey || AGN || align=right | 1.0 km || 
|-id=542 bgcolor=#d6d6d6
| 448542 ||  || — || April 13, 2004 || Kitt Peak || Spacewatch || — || align=right | 2.0 km || 
|-id=543 bgcolor=#d6d6d6
| 448543 ||  || — || February 21, 2007 || Mount Lemmon || Mount Lemmon Survey || — || align=right | 3.9 km || 
|-id=544 bgcolor=#d6d6d6
| 448544 ||  || — || September 1, 2010 || Mount Lemmon || Mount Lemmon Survey || — || align=right | 2.5 km || 
|-id=545 bgcolor=#fefefe
| 448545 ||  || — || September 2, 2010 || Socorro || LINEAR || H || align=right data-sort-value="0.86" | 860 m || 
|-id=546 bgcolor=#E9E9E9
| 448546 ||  || — || November 25, 2006 || Kitt Peak || Spacewatch || — || align=right | 2.3 km || 
|-id=547 bgcolor=#d6d6d6
| 448547 ||  || — || February 8, 2008 || Mount Lemmon || Mount Lemmon Survey || — || align=right | 2.4 km || 
|-id=548 bgcolor=#d6d6d6
| 448548 ||  || — || September 6, 2010 || Kitt Peak || Spacewatch || EOS || align=right | 1.6 km || 
|-id=549 bgcolor=#d6d6d6
| 448549 ||  || — || September 5, 2010 || Mount Lemmon || Mount Lemmon Survey || — || align=right | 2.2 km || 
|-id=550 bgcolor=#E9E9E9
| 448550 ||  || — || September 20, 2001 || Kitt Peak || Spacewatch || — || align=right | 2.6 km || 
|-id=551 bgcolor=#E9E9E9
| 448551 ||  || — || February 10, 2008 || Mount Lemmon || Mount Lemmon Survey || — || align=right | 2.0 km || 
|-id=552 bgcolor=#E9E9E9
| 448552 ||  || — || July 11, 2005 || Kitt Peak || Spacewatch || — || align=right | 2.1 km || 
|-id=553 bgcolor=#d6d6d6
| 448553 ||  || — || February 22, 2007 || Kitt Peak || Spacewatch || — || align=right | 2.1 km || 
|-id=554 bgcolor=#E9E9E9
| 448554 ||  || — || September 10, 2010 || Kitt Peak || Spacewatch || AGN || align=right | 1.1 km || 
|-id=555 bgcolor=#d6d6d6
| 448555 ||  || — || September 10, 2010 || Kitt Peak || Spacewatch || — || align=right | 2.3 km || 
|-id=556 bgcolor=#E9E9E9
| 448556 ||  || — || September 10, 2010 || Mount Lemmon || Mount Lemmon Survey || — || align=right | 1.7 km || 
|-id=557 bgcolor=#d6d6d6
| 448557 ||  || — || September 11, 2010 || Kitt Peak || Spacewatch || BRA || align=right | 1.5 km || 
|-id=558 bgcolor=#d6d6d6
| 448558 ||  || — || September 11, 2010 || Kitt Peak || Spacewatch || — || align=right | 2.3 km || 
|-id=559 bgcolor=#d6d6d6
| 448559 ||  || — || September 11, 2010 || Mount Lemmon || Mount Lemmon Survey || — || align=right | 2.3 km || 
|-id=560 bgcolor=#d6d6d6
| 448560 ||  || — || December 9, 2006 || Kitt Peak || Spacewatch || KOR || align=right | 1.5 km || 
|-id=561 bgcolor=#d6d6d6
| 448561 ||  || — || September 14, 2010 || Kitt Peak || Spacewatch || — || align=right | 3.4 km || 
|-id=562 bgcolor=#FA8072
| 448562 ||  || — || September 26, 1998 || Socorro || LINEAR || — || align=right data-sort-value="0.56" | 560 m || 
|-id=563 bgcolor=#E9E9E9
| 448563 ||  || — || September 15, 2010 || Kitt Peak || Spacewatch || GEF || align=right | 1.3 km || 
|-id=564 bgcolor=#E9E9E9
| 448564 ||  || — || September 15, 2010 || Kitt Peak || Spacewatch || — || align=right | 2.0 km || 
|-id=565 bgcolor=#d6d6d6
| 448565 ||  || — || September 15, 2010 || Kitt Peak || Spacewatch || KOR || align=right | 1.4 km || 
|-id=566 bgcolor=#E9E9E9
| 448566 ||  || — || April 3, 2008 || Mount Lemmon || Mount Lemmon Survey || — || align=right | 1.8 km || 
|-id=567 bgcolor=#d6d6d6
| 448567 ||  || — || October 9, 2005 || Kitt Peak || Spacewatch || — || align=right | 2.0 km || 
|-id=568 bgcolor=#d6d6d6
| 448568 ||  || — || September 16, 2010 || Mount Lemmon || Mount Lemmon Survey || — || align=right | 2.7 km || 
|-id=569 bgcolor=#d6d6d6
| 448569 ||  || — || September 16, 2010 || Kitt Peak || Spacewatch || — || align=right | 2.6 km || 
|-id=570 bgcolor=#d6d6d6
| 448570 ||  || — || February 3, 2008 || Kitt Peak || Spacewatch || — || align=right | 3.3 km || 
|-id=571 bgcolor=#d6d6d6
| 448571 ||  || — || September 12, 2005 || Kitt Peak || Spacewatch || KOR || align=right | 1.4 km || 
|-id=572 bgcolor=#d6d6d6
| 448572 ||  || — || October 9, 1994 || Kitt Peak || Spacewatch || — || align=right | 2.2 km || 
|-id=573 bgcolor=#d6d6d6
| 448573 ||  || — || March 27, 2008 || Mount Lemmon || Mount Lemmon Survey || — || align=right | 2.8 km || 
|-id=574 bgcolor=#E9E9E9
| 448574 ||  || — || August 28, 2005 || Kitt Peak || Spacewatch || AGN || align=right | 1.1 km || 
|-id=575 bgcolor=#d6d6d6
| 448575 ||  || — || September 13, 2005 || Kitt Peak || Spacewatch || KOR || align=right | 1.3 km || 
|-id=576 bgcolor=#E9E9E9
| 448576 ||  || — || September 19, 2010 || Kitt Peak || Spacewatch || — || align=right | 1.8 km || 
|-id=577 bgcolor=#d6d6d6
| 448577 ||  || — || October 3, 2010 || Kitt Peak || Spacewatch || BRA || align=right | 1.3 km || 
|-id=578 bgcolor=#d6d6d6
| 448578 ||  || — || September 15, 2010 || Mount Lemmon || Mount Lemmon Survey || — || align=right | 2.6 km || 
|-id=579 bgcolor=#d6d6d6
| 448579 ||  || — || September 13, 2005 || Kitt Peak || Spacewatch || — || align=right | 2.0 km || 
|-id=580 bgcolor=#d6d6d6
| 448580 ||  || — || March 29, 2008 || Mount Lemmon || Mount Lemmon Survey || — || align=right | 2.9 km || 
|-id=581 bgcolor=#d6d6d6
| 448581 ||  || — || August 30, 2005 || Kitt Peak || Spacewatch || KOR || align=right | 1.3 km || 
|-id=582 bgcolor=#E9E9E9
| 448582 ||  || — || September 2, 2010 || Mount Lemmon || Mount Lemmon Survey || — || align=right | 1.9 km || 
|-id=583 bgcolor=#d6d6d6
| 448583 ||  || — || June 14, 2010 || WISE || WISE || BRA || align=right | 1.7 km || 
|-id=584 bgcolor=#d6d6d6
| 448584 ||  || — || September 9, 2010 || Kitt Peak || Spacewatch || NAE || align=right | 1.6 km || 
|-id=585 bgcolor=#d6d6d6
| 448585 ||  || — || October 3, 2010 || Kitt Peak || Spacewatch || — || align=right | 2.5 km || 
|-id=586 bgcolor=#d6d6d6
| 448586 ||  || — || October 5, 2005 || Mount Lemmon || Mount Lemmon Survey || KOR || align=right | 1.2 km || 
|-id=587 bgcolor=#d6d6d6
| 448587 ||  || — || September 29, 2005 || Mount Lemmon || Mount Lemmon Survey || — || align=right | 2.3 km || 
|-id=588 bgcolor=#d6d6d6
| 448588 ||  || — || May 2, 2008 || Kitt Peak || Spacewatch || — || align=right | 2.4 km || 
|-id=589 bgcolor=#d6d6d6
| 448589 ||  || — || September 17, 2010 || Kitt Peak || Spacewatch || BRA || align=right | 1.4 km || 
|-id=590 bgcolor=#d6d6d6
| 448590 ||  || — || October 1, 2010 || Mount Lemmon || Mount Lemmon Survey || BRA || align=right | 1.6 km || 
|-id=591 bgcolor=#d6d6d6
| 448591 ||  || — || March 31, 2008 || Mount Lemmon || Mount Lemmon Survey || KOR || align=right | 1.1 km || 
|-id=592 bgcolor=#d6d6d6
| 448592 ||  || — || September 1, 2005 || Kitt Peak || Spacewatch || KOR || align=right | 1.1 km || 
|-id=593 bgcolor=#d6d6d6
| 448593 ||  || — || February 28, 2008 || Mount Lemmon || Mount Lemmon Survey || KOR || align=right | 1.4 km || 
|-id=594 bgcolor=#d6d6d6
| 448594 ||  || — || September 11, 2010 || Kitt Peak || Spacewatch || THM || align=right | 1.8 km || 
|-id=595 bgcolor=#d6d6d6
| 448595 ||  || — || October 9, 2005 || Kitt Peak || Spacewatch || — || align=right | 2.1 km || 
|-id=596 bgcolor=#d6d6d6
| 448596 ||  || — || August 21, 2004 || Siding Spring || SSS || — || align=right | 3.2 km || 
|-id=597 bgcolor=#d6d6d6
| 448597 ||  || — || September 25, 2005 || Kitt Peak || Spacewatch || — || align=right | 2.1 km || 
|-id=598 bgcolor=#d6d6d6
| 448598 ||  || — || October 11, 2010 || Mount Lemmon || Mount Lemmon Survey || — || align=right | 1.8 km || 
|-id=599 bgcolor=#d6d6d6
| 448599 ||  || — || March 15, 2008 || Kitt Peak || Spacewatch || — || align=right | 3.2 km || 
|-id=600 bgcolor=#d6d6d6
| 448600 ||  || — || September 16, 2010 || Mount Lemmon || Mount Lemmon Survey || — || align=right | 2.3 km || 
|}

448601–448700 

|-bgcolor=#d6d6d6
| 448601 ||  || — || September 10, 2010 || Mount Lemmon || Mount Lemmon Survey || — || align=right | 2.6 km || 
|-id=602 bgcolor=#fefefe
| 448602 ||  || — || March 14, 2004 || Kitt Peak || Spacewatch || H || align=right data-sort-value="0.62" | 620 m || 
|-id=603 bgcolor=#d6d6d6
| 448603 ||  || — || October 3, 2010 || Kitt Peak || Spacewatch || — || align=right | 2.3 km || 
|-id=604 bgcolor=#d6d6d6
| 448604 ||  || — || October 24, 2005 || Kitt Peak || Spacewatch || — || align=right | 2.4 km || 
|-id=605 bgcolor=#d6d6d6
| 448605 ||  || — || October 27, 2005 || Mount Lemmon || Mount Lemmon Survey || KOR || align=right data-sort-value="0.99" | 990 m || 
|-id=606 bgcolor=#d6d6d6
| 448606 ||  || — || April 24, 2003 || Kitt Peak || Spacewatch || — || align=right | 4.0 km || 
|-id=607 bgcolor=#d6d6d6
| 448607 ||  || — || December 1, 2005 || Mount Lemmon || Mount Lemmon Survey || — || align=right | 2.5 km || 
|-id=608 bgcolor=#d6d6d6
| 448608 ||  || — || October 29, 2005 || Catalina || CSS || — || align=right | 2.7 km || 
|-id=609 bgcolor=#d6d6d6
| 448609 ||  || — || October 29, 2010 || Mount Lemmon || Mount Lemmon Survey || — || align=right | 2.8 km || 
|-id=610 bgcolor=#d6d6d6
| 448610 ||  || — || July 27, 2009 || Kitt Peak || Spacewatch || — || align=right | 2.9 km || 
|-id=611 bgcolor=#d6d6d6
| 448611 ||  || — || October 13, 2010 || Mount Lemmon || Mount Lemmon Survey || — || align=right | 2.3 km || 
|-id=612 bgcolor=#d6d6d6
| 448612 ||  || — || September 16, 2010 || Mount Lemmon || Mount Lemmon Survey || — || align=right | 2.6 km || 
|-id=613 bgcolor=#d6d6d6
| 448613 ||  || — || December 30, 2005 || Kitt Peak || Spacewatch || — || align=right | 2.7 km || 
|-id=614 bgcolor=#d6d6d6
| 448614 ||  || — || August 12, 2010 || Kitt Peak || Spacewatch || — || align=right | 3.2 km || 
|-id=615 bgcolor=#d6d6d6
| 448615 ||  || — || March 20, 2007 || Mount Lemmon || Mount Lemmon Survey || — || align=right | 2.3 km || 
|-id=616 bgcolor=#d6d6d6
| 448616 ||  || — || October 29, 2010 || Kitt Peak || Spacewatch || — || align=right | 4.0 km || 
|-id=617 bgcolor=#d6d6d6
| 448617 ||  || — || October 30, 2010 || Catalina || CSS || — || align=right | 3.8 km || 
|-id=618 bgcolor=#d6d6d6
| 448618 ||  || — || October 14, 2010 || Mount Lemmon || Mount Lemmon Survey || — || align=right | 2.1 km || 
|-id=619 bgcolor=#d6d6d6
| 448619 ||  || — || October 12, 1999 || Socorro || LINEAR || — || align=right | 3.5 km || 
|-id=620 bgcolor=#d6d6d6
| 448620 ||  || — || October 29, 2010 || Kitt Peak || Spacewatch || EOS || align=right | 2.0 km || 
|-id=621 bgcolor=#d6d6d6
| 448621 ||  || — || September 11, 2010 || Mount Lemmon || Mount Lemmon Survey || — || align=right | 3.6 km || 
|-id=622 bgcolor=#d6d6d6
| 448622 ||  || — || December 3, 2005 || Kitt Peak || Spacewatch || — || align=right | 2.8 km || 
|-id=623 bgcolor=#d6d6d6
| 448623 ||  || — || October 9, 2004 || Socorro || LINEAR || — || align=right | 3.3 km || 
|-id=624 bgcolor=#E9E9E9
| 448624 ||  || — || September 18, 2010 || Mount Lemmon || Mount Lemmon Survey || — || align=right | 2.2 km || 
|-id=625 bgcolor=#d6d6d6
| 448625 ||  || — || October 17, 2010 || Mount Lemmon || Mount Lemmon Survey || VER || align=right | 2.6 km || 
|-id=626 bgcolor=#d6d6d6
| 448626 ||  || — || October 30, 2005 || Mount Lemmon || Mount Lemmon Survey || — || align=right | 2.5 km || 
|-id=627 bgcolor=#d6d6d6
| 448627 ||  || — || April 15, 2008 || Mount Lemmon || Mount Lemmon Survey || EOS || align=right | 2.0 km || 
|-id=628 bgcolor=#FFC2E0
| 448628 ||  || — || November 2, 2010 || Haleakala || Pan-STARRS || APO || align=right data-sort-value="0.30" | 300 m || 
|-id=629 bgcolor=#d6d6d6
| 448629 ||  || — || October 12, 2010 || Mount Lemmon || Mount Lemmon Survey || — || align=right | 2.9 km || 
|-id=630 bgcolor=#fefefe
| 448630 ||  || — || December 4, 2005 || Catalina || CSS || H || align=right data-sort-value="0.98" | 980 m || 
|-id=631 bgcolor=#d6d6d6
| 448631 ||  || — || November 1, 2010 || Kitt Peak || Spacewatch || — || align=right | 3.0 km || 
|-id=632 bgcolor=#d6d6d6
| 448632 ||  || — || August 9, 2010 || WISE || WISE || — || align=right | 4.0 km || 
|-id=633 bgcolor=#d6d6d6
| 448633 ||  || — || November 29, 2005 || Kitt Peak || Spacewatch || — || align=right | 3.4 km || 
|-id=634 bgcolor=#d6d6d6
| 448634 ||  || — || October 13, 2010 || Mount Lemmon || Mount Lemmon Survey || — || align=right | 3.5 km || 
|-id=635 bgcolor=#d6d6d6
| 448635 ||  || — || October 26, 1994 || Kitt Peak || Spacewatch || — || align=right | 2.2 km || 
|-id=636 bgcolor=#d6d6d6
| 448636 ||  || — || October 29, 2005 || Mount Lemmon || Mount Lemmon Survey || — || align=right | 2.0 km || 
|-id=637 bgcolor=#d6d6d6
| 448637 ||  || — || October 13, 2010 || Mount Lemmon || Mount Lemmon Survey || — || align=right | 3.2 km || 
|-id=638 bgcolor=#d6d6d6
| 448638 ||  || — || October 29, 2010 || Mount Lemmon || Mount Lemmon Survey || — || align=right | 2.5 km || 
|-id=639 bgcolor=#d6d6d6
| 448639 ||  || — || October 9, 2010 || Mount Lemmon || Mount Lemmon Survey || EOS || align=right | 1.9 km || 
|-id=640 bgcolor=#d6d6d6
| 448640 ||  || — || March 19, 2007 || Mount Lemmon || Mount Lemmon Survey || — || align=right | 3.4 km || 
|-id=641 bgcolor=#d6d6d6
| 448641 ||  || — || October 29, 2010 || Mount Lemmon || Mount Lemmon Survey || — || align=right | 3.7 km || 
|-id=642 bgcolor=#d6d6d6
| 448642 ||  || — || May 2, 2003 || Kitt Peak || Spacewatch || — || align=right | 3.4 km || 
|-id=643 bgcolor=#d6d6d6
| 448643 ||  || — || December 28, 2005 || Mount Lemmon || Mount Lemmon Survey || — || align=right | 2.4 km || 
|-id=644 bgcolor=#d6d6d6
| 448644 ||  || — || November 6, 2010 || Kitt Peak || Spacewatch || — || align=right | 2.3 km || 
|-id=645 bgcolor=#d6d6d6
| 448645 ||  || — || October 29, 2010 || Kitt Peak || Spacewatch || — || align=right | 2.4 km || 
|-id=646 bgcolor=#d6d6d6
| 448646 ||  || — || December 21, 2005 || Kitt Peak || Spacewatch || — || align=right | 2.7 km || 
|-id=647 bgcolor=#d6d6d6
| 448647 ||  || — || September 15, 2004 || Kitt Peak || Spacewatch || THM || align=right | 1.9 km || 
|-id=648 bgcolor=#d6d6d6
| 448648 ||  || — || November 5, 2010 || Kitt Peak || Spacewatch || — || align=right | 3.0 km || 
|-id=649 bgcolor=#d6d6d6
| 448649 ||  || — || November 5, 2010 || Kitt Peak || Spacewatch || — || align=right | 1.8 km || 
|-id=650 bgcolor=#d6d6d6
| 448650 ||  || — || January 5, 2006 || Kitt Peak || Spacewatch || — || align=right | 2.5 km || 
|-id=651 bgcolor=#d6d6d6
| 448651 ||  || — || November 21, 2005 || Kitt Peak || Spacewatch || — || align=right | 3.2 km || 
|-id=652 bgcolor=#d6d6d6
| 448652 ||  || — || October 12, 2010 || Mount Lemmon || Mount Lemmon Survey || — || align=right | 2.6 km || 
|-id=653 bgcolor=#d6d6d6
| 448653 ||  || — || November 7, 2010 || Kitt Peak || Spacewatch || — || align=right | 2.3 km || 
|-id=654 bgcolor=#d6d6d6
| 448654 ||  || — || October 31, 1999 || Kitt Peak || Spacewatch || — || align=right | 2.0 km || 
|-id=655 bgcolor=#d6d6d6
| 448655 ||  || — || October 14, 2010 || Mount Lemmon || Mount Lemmon Survey || — || align=right | 3.7 km || 
|-id=656 bgcolor=#d6d6d6
| 448656 ||  || — || November 21, 2005 || Kitt Peak || Spacewatch || — || align=right | 2.8 km || 
|-id=657 bgcolor=#d6d6d6
| 448657 ||  || — || October 28, 1994 || Kitt Peak || Spacewatch || — || align=right | 2.7 km || 
|-id=658 bgcolor=#d6d6d6
| 448658 ||  || — || November 6, 2010 || Mount Lemmon || Mount Lemmon Survey || EOS || align=right | 2.2 km || 
|-id=659 bgcolor=#d6d6d6
| 448659 ||  || — || June 23, 2009 || Mount Lemmon || Mount Lemmon Survey || — || align=right | 2.5 km || 
|-id=660 bgcolor=#d6d6d6
| 448660 ||  || — || November 6, 2010 || Mount Lemmon || Mount Lemmon Survey || EOS || align=right | 1.9 km || 
|-id=661 bgcolor=#d6d6d6
| 448661 ||  || — || October 13, 2010 || Mount Lemmon || Mount Lemmon Survey || — || align=right | 3.1 km || 
|-id=662 bgcolor=#d6d6d6
| 448662 ||  || — || September 7, 2004 || Kitt Peak || Spacewatch || — || align=right | 2.4 km || 
|-id=663 bgcolor=#d6d6d6
| 448663 ||  || — || November 10, 2010 || Mount Lemmon || Mount Lemmon Survey || — || align=right | 3.4 km || 
|-id=664 bgcolor=#d6d6d6
| 448664 ||  || — || May 11, 2002 || Socorro || LINEAR || — || align=right | 4.0 km || 
|-id=665 bgcolor=#d6d6d6
| 448665 ||  || — || September 12, 2004 || Kitt Peak || Spacewatch || — || align=right | 2.8 km || 
|-id=666 bgcolor=#d6d6d6
| 448666 ||  || — || October 17, 1999 || Kitt Peak || Spacewatch || — || align=right | 2.2 km || 
|-id=667 bgcolor=#d6d6d6
| 448667 ||  || — || December 1, 2005 || Mount Lemmon || Mount Lemmon Survey || EOS || align=right | 1.6 km || 
|-id=668 bgcolor=#d6d6d6
| 448668 ||  || — || November 11, 2010 || Mount Lemmon || Mount Lemmon Survey || — || align=right | 4.1 km || 
|-id=669 bgcolor=#d6d6d6
| 448669 ||  || — || April 27, 2008 || Mount Lemmon || Mount Lemmon Survey || — || align=right | 2.3 km || 
|-id=670 bgcolor=#d6d6d6
| 448670 ||  || — || December 8, 2005 || Kitt Peak || Spacewatch || EOS || align=right | 1.8 km || 
|-id=671 bgcolor=#d6d6d6
| 448671 ||  || — || March 11, 2007 || Kitt Peak || Spacewatch || — || align=right | 3.1 km || 
|-id=672 bgcolor=#d6d6d6
| 448672 ||  || — || October 3, 1999 || Kitt Peak || Spacewatch || — || align=right | 2.3 km || 
|-id=673 bgcolor=#d6d6d6
| 448673 ||  || — || January 21, 2010 || WISE || WISE || — || align=right | 2.9 km || 
|-id=674 bgcolor=#d6d6d6
| 448674 ||  || — || October 17, 2010 || Mount Lemmon || Mount Lemmon Survey || — || align=right | 3.0 km || 
|-id=675 bgcolor=#d6d6d6
| 448675 ||  || — || September 3, 2010 || Mount Lemmon || Mount Lemmon Survey || EOS || align=right | 1.9 km || 
|-id=676 bgcolor=#d6d6d6
| 448676 ||  || — || October 27, 2005 || Mount Lemmon || Mount Lemmon Survey || — || align=right | 2.2 km || 
|-id=677 bgcolor=#d6d6d6
| 448677 ||  || — || October 17, 2010 || Mount Lemmon || Mount Lemmon Survey || — || align=right | 3.6 km || 
|-id=678 bgcolor=#d6d6d6
| 448678 ||  || — || October 31, 2010 || Mount Lemmon || Mount Lemmon Survey || 615 || align=right | 1.3 km || 
|-id=679 bgcolor=#d6d6d6
| 448679 ||  || — || May 27, 2008 || Mount Lemmon || Mount Lemmon Survey || — || align=right | 2.7 km || 
|-id=680 bgcolor=#d6d6d6
| 448680 ||  || — || October 29, 2010 || Mount Lemmon || Mount Lemmon Survey || EOS || align=right | 1.9 km || 
|-id=681 bgcolor=#d6d6d6
| 448681 ||  || — || May 5, 2008 || Mount Lemmon || Mount Lemmon Survey || EOS || align=right | 1.9 km || 
|-id=682 bgcolor=#d6d6d6
| 448682 ||  || — || September 11, 2010 || Mount Lemmon || Mount Lemmon Survey || — || align=right | 2.4 km || 
|-id=683 bgcolor=#d6d6d6
| 448683 ||  || — || December 25, 2005 || Mount Lemmon || Mount Lemmon Survey || — || align=right | 2.4 km || 
|-id=684 bgcolor=#d6d6d6
| 448684 ||  || — || November 11, 2010 || Mount Lemmon || Mount Lemmon Survey || — || align=right | 3.2 km || 
|-id=685 bgcolor=#d6d6d6
| 448685 ||  || — || November 27, 2010 || Mount Lemmon || Mount Lemmon Survey || — || align=right | 1.9 km || 
|-id=686 bgcolor=#d6d6d6
| 448686 ||  || — || November 14, 1999 || Socorro || LINEAR || — || align=right | 3.0 km || 
|-id=687 bgcolor=#d6d6d6
| 448687 ||  || — || October 29, 2010 || Kitt Peak || Spacewatch || — || align=right | 3.4 km || 
|-id=688 bgcolor=#d6d6d6
| 448688 ||  || — || November 3, 2010 || Kitt Peak || Spacewatch || — || align=right | 4.3 km || 
|-id=689 bgcolor=#d6d6d6
| 448689 ||  || — || November 27, 2010 || Mount Lemmon || Mount Lemmon Survey || THM || align=right | 2.0 km || 
|-id=690 bgcolor=#d6d6d6
| 448690 ||  || — || November 12, 1999 || Kitt Peak || Spacewatch || — || align=right | 1.9 km || 
|-id=691 bgcolor=#d6d6d6
| 448691 ||  || — || November 6, 2010 || Mount Lemmon || Mount Lemmon Survey || — || align=right | 3.3 km || 
|-id=692 bgcolor=#d6d6d6
| 448692 ||  || — || February 25, 2006 || Anderson Mesa || LONEOS || — || align=right | 3.9 km || 
|-id=693 bgcolor=#d6d6d6
| 448693 ||  || — || September 12, 2004 || Kitt Peak || Spacewatch || — || align=right | 2.7 km || 
|-id=694 bgcolor=#d6d6d6
| 448694 ||  || — || December 26, 2005 || Kitt Peak || Spacewatch || — || align=right | 3.2 km || 
|-id=695 bgcolor=#d6d6d6
| 448695 ||  || — || November 5, 2010 || Kitt Peak || Spacewatch || — || align=right | 3.8 km || 
|-id=696 bgcolor=#d6d6d6
| 448696 ||  || — || March 9, 2007 || Mount Lemmon || Mount Lemmon Survey || EOS || align=right | 1.7 km || 
|-id=697 bgcolor=#d6d6d6
| 448697 ||  || — || November 9, 2004 || Catalina || CSS || — || align=right | 4.0 km || 
|-id=698 bgcolor=#d6d6d6
| 448698 ||  || — || December 2, 2010 || Mount Lemmon || Mount Lemmon Survey || — || align=right | 2.6 km || 
|-id=699 bgcolor=#d6d6d6
| 448699 ||  || — || December 22, 2005 || Kitt Peak || Spacewatch || — || align=right | 2.4 km || 
|-id=700 bgcolor=#d6d6d6
| 448700 ||  || — || October 31, 2010 || Kitt Peak || Spacewatch || — || align=right | 2.6 km || 
|}

448701–448800 

|-bgcolor=#d6d6d6
| 448701 ||  || — || November 8, 2010 || Kitt Peak || Spacewatch || — || align=right | 3.3 km || 
|-id=702 bgcolor=#d6d6d6
| 448702 ||  || — || October 13, 2005 || Kitt Peak || Spacewatch || — || align=right | 4.0 km || 
|-id=703 bgcolor=#d6d6d6
| 448703 ||  || — || January 27, 2006 || Mount Lemmon || Mount Lemmon Survey || THM || align=right | 2.2 km || 
|-id=704 bgcolor=#d6d6d6
| 448704 ||  || — || October 5, 2004 || Kitt Peak || Spacewatch || THM || align=right | 2.3 km || 
|-id=705 bgcolor=#d6d6d6
| 448705 ||  || — || September 15, 2009 || Mount Lemmon || Mount Lemmon Survey || LIX || align=right | 3.6 km || 
|-id=706 bgcolor=#d6d6d6
| 448706 ||  || — || August 11, 2004 || Siding Spring || SSS || — || align=right | 3.7 km || 
|-id=707 bgcolor=#d6d6d6
| 448707 ||  || — || February 24, 2006 || Kitt Peak || Spacewatch || — || align=right | 2.5 km || 
|-id=708 bgcolor=#d6d6d6
| 448708 ||  || — || January 10, 2006 || Mount Lemmon || Mount Lemmon Survey || — || align=right | 1.9 km || 
|-id=709 bgcolor=#d6d6d6
| 448709 ||  || — || October 10, 2004 || Socorro || LINEAR || — || align=right | 3.5 km || 
|-id=710 bgcolor=#d6d6d6
| 448710 ||  || — || May 3, 2008 || Mount Lemmon || Mount Lemmon Survey || THM || align=right | 1.9 km || 
|-id=711 bgcolor=#d6d6d6
| 448711 ||  || — || November 8, 2010 || Mount Lemmon || Mount Lemmon Survey || — || align=right | 3.7 km || 
|-id=712 bgcolor=#d6d6d6
| 448712 ||  || — || December 10, 2010 || Mount Lemmon || Mount Lemmon Survey || — || align=right | 3.2 km || 
|-id=713 bgcolor=#d6d6d6
| 448713 ||  || — || December 10, 2010 || Mount Lemmon || Mount Lemmon Survey || — || align=right | 3.2 km || 
|-id=714 bgcolor=#d6d6d6
| 448714 ||  || — || July 3, 2003 || Kitt Peak || Spacewatch || — || align=right | 3.9 km || 
|-id=715 bgcolor=#d6d6d6
| 448715 ||  || — || December 13, 2010 || Catalina || CSS || — || align=right | 3.0 km || 
|-id=716 bgcolor=#d6d6d6
| 448716 ||  || — || January 12, 2010 || WISE || WISE || — || align=right | 3.4 km || 
|-id=717 bgcolor=#d6d6d6
| 448717 ||  || — || January 14, 2011 || Mount Lemmon || Mount Lemmon Survey || — || align=right | 2.4 km || 
|-id=718 bgcolor=#d6d6d6
| 448718 ||  || — || January 18, 2010 || WISE || WISE || — || align=right | 3.7 km || 
|-id=719 bgcolor=#d6d6d6
| 448719 ||  || — || December 11, 2004 || Kitt Peak || Spacewatch || — || align=right | 2.8 km || 
|-id=720 bgcolor=#d6d6d6
| 448720 ||  || — || December 14, 2010 || Catalina || CSS || Tj (2.99) || align=right | 4.1 km || 
|-id=721 bgcolor=#FFC2E0
| 448721 ||  || — || January 28, 2011 || Mount Lemmon || Mount Lemmon Survey || APOPHAcritical || align=right data-sort-value="0.23" | 230 m || 
|-id=722 bgcolor=#d6d6d6
| 448722 ||  || — || September 19, 2009 || Catalina || CSS || — || align=right | 3.4 km || 
|-id=723 bgcolor=#d6d6d6
| 448723 ||  || — || January 17, 2010 || WISE || WISE || — || align=right | 2.8 km || 
|-id=724 bgcolor=#FFC2E0
| 448724 ||  || — || January 30, 2011 || Haleakala || Pan-STARRS || AMO || align=right data-sort-value="0.43" | 430 m || 
|-id=725 bgcolor=#d6d6d6
| 448725 ||  || — || January 14, 2010 || WISE || WISE || — || align=right | 3.7 km || 
|-id=726 bgcolor=#d6d6d6
| 448726 ||  || — || January 2, 2011 || Catalina || CSS || — || align=right | 3.5 km || 
|-id=727 bgcolor=#d6d6d6
| 448727 ||  || — || December 5, 2010 || Mount Lemmon || Mount Lemmon Survey || LIX || align=right | 4.0 km || 
|-id=728 bgcolor=#d6d6d6
| 448728 ||  || — || February 27, 2006 || Mount Lemmon || Mount Lemmon Survey || — || align=right | 2.9 km || 
|-id=729 bgcolor=#d6d6d6
| 448729 ||  || — || November 3, 2010 || Mount Lemmon || Mount Lemmon Survey || LIX || align=right | 3.5 km || 
|-id=730 bgcolor=#d6d6d6
| 448730 ||  || — || October 19, 2010 || Mount Lemmon || Mount Lemmon Survey || EOS || align=right | 2.2 km || 
|-id=731 bgcolor=#fefefe
| 448731 ||  || — || September 13, 2004 || Socorro || LINEAR || H || align=right data-sort-value="0.60" | 600 m || 
|-id=732 bgcolor=#d6d6d6
| 448732 ||  || — || February 2, 2000 || Socorro || LINEAR || — || align=right | 2.3 km || 
|-id=733 bgcolor=#fefefe
| 448733 ||  || — || February 16, 2004 || Kitt Peak || Spacewatch || — || align=right data-sort-value="0.77" | 770 m || 
|-id=734 bgcolor=#fefefe
| 448734 ||  || — || April 29, 2008 || Mount Lemmon || Mount Lemmon Survey || — || align=right data-sort-value="0.87" | 870 m || 
|-id=735 bgcolor=#d6d6d6
| 448735 ||  || — || October 3, 2003 || Kitt Peak || Spacewatch || — || align=right | 2.2 km || 
|-id=736 bgcolor=#fefefe
| 448736 ||  || — || September 29, 2005 || Kitt Peak || Spacewatch || — || align=right data-sort-value="0.59" | 590 m || 
|-id=737 bgcolor=#fefefe
| 448737 ||  || — || April 13, 2011 || Mount Lemmon || Mount Lemmon Survey || — || align=right data-sort-value="0.64" | 640 m || 
|-id=738 bgcolor=#fefefe
| 448738 ||  || — || December 16, 2006 || Kitt Peak || Spacewatch || — || align=right data-sort-value="0.67" | 670 m || 
|-id=739 bgcolor=#fefefe
| 448739 ||  || — || October 3, 2005 || Kitt Peak || Spacewatch || — || align=right data-sort-value="0.62" | 620 m || 
|-id=740 bgcolor=#fefefe
| 448740 ||  || — || April 1, 2011 || Kitt Peak || Spacewatch || — || align=right data-sort-value="0.86" | 860 m || 
|-id=741 bgcolor=#fefefe
| 448741 ||  || — || April 30, 2011 || Mount Lemmon || Mount Lemmon Survey || — || align=right data-sort-value="0.77" | 770 m || 
|-id=742 bgcolor=#d6d6d6
| 448742 ||  || — || October 19, 2003 || Kitt Peak || Spacewatch || Tj (2.8) || align=right | 5.4 km || 
|-id=743 bgcolor=#fefefe
| 448743 ||  || — || July 30, 2008 || Kitt Peak || Spacewatch || — || align=right data-sort-value="0.75" | 750 m || 
|-id=744 bgcolor=#fefefe
| 448744 ||  || — || March 29, 2011 || Kitt Peak || Spacewatch || — || align=right data-sort-value="0.71" | 710 m || 
|-id=745 bgcolor=#fefefe
| 448745 ||  || — || April 13, 2011 || Mount Lemmon || Mount Lemmon Survey || — || align=right data-sort-value="0.64" | 640 m || 
|-id=746 bgcolor=#fefefe
| 448746 ||  || — || November 4, 2004 || Kitt Peak || Spacewatch || — || align=right data-sort-value="0.78" | 780 m || 
|-id=747 bgcolor=#fefefe
| 448747 ||  || — || October 4, 2004 || Kitt Peak || Spacewatch || NYS || align=right data-sort-value="0.71" | 710 m || 
|-id=748 bgcolor=#fefefe
| 448748 ||  || — || April 18, 2007 || Kitt Peak || Spacewatch || — || align=right data-sort-value="0.73" | 730 m || 
|-id=749 bgcolor=#fefefe
| 448749 ||  || — || March 16, 2007 || Kitt Peak || Spacewatch || — || align=right data-sort-value="0.68" | 680 m || 
|-id=750 bgcolor=#fefefe
| 448750 ||  || — || April 14, 2007 || Mount Lemmon || Mount Lemmon Survey || — || align=right data-sort-value="0.71" | 710 m || 
|-id=751 bgcolor=#fefefe
| 448751 ||  || — || April 23, 2007 || Mount Lemmon || Mount Lemmon Survey || — || align=right data-sort-value="0.89" | 890 m || 
|-id=752 bgcolor=#fefefe
| 448752 ||  || — || November 19, 2008 || Kitt Peak || Spacewatch || V || align=right data-sort-value="0.54" | 540 m || 
|-id=753 bgcolor=#fefefe
| 448753 ||  || — || December 22, 2008 || Mount Lemmon || Mount Lemmon Survey || — || align=right data-sort-value="0.86" | 860 m || 
|-id=754 bgcolor=#fefefe
| 448754 ||  || — || March 5, 2006 || Kitt Peak || Spacewatch || — || align=right data-sort-value="0.83" | 830 m || 
|-id=755 bgcolor=#fefefe
| 448755 ||  || — || January 27, 2006 || Mount Lemmon || Mount Lemmon Survey || — || align=right data-sort-value="0.86" | 860 m || 
|-id=756 bgcolor=#fefefe
| 448756 ||  || — || June 14, 2007 || Kitt Peak || Spacewatch || — || align=right data-sort-value="0.81" | 810 m || 
|-id=757 bgcolor=#fefefe
| 448757 ||  || — || June 5, 2011 || Mount Lemmon || Mount Lemmon Survey || — || align=right data-sort-value="0.78" | 780 m || 
|-id=758 bgcolor=#E9E9E9
| 448758 ||  || — || September 9, 2007 || Kitt Peak || Spacewatch || EUN || align=right | 1.1 km || 
|-id=759 bgcolor=#fefefe
| 448759 ||  || — || January 3, 2009 || Kitt Peak || Spacewatch || MAS || align=right data-sort-value="0.71" | 710 m || 
|-id=760 bgcolor=#fefefe
| 448760 ||  || — || April 25, 2007 || Kitt Peak || Spacewatch || — || align=right data-sort-value="0.75" | 750 m || 
|-id=761 bgcolor=#fefefe
| 448761 ||  || — || June 21, 2007 || Mount Lemmon || Mount Lemmon Survey || — || align=right | 1.0 km || 
|-id=762 bgcolor=#E9E9E9
| 448762 ||  || — || September 15, 2007 || Kitt Peak || Spacewatch || — || align=right data-sort-value="0.77" | 770 m || 
|-id=763 bgcolor=#fefefe
| 448763 ||  || — || October 1, 2000 || Socorro || LINEAR || — || align=right data-sort-value="0.78" | 780 m || 
|-id=764 bgcolor=#E9E9E9
| 448764 ||  || — || May 13, 2010 || WISE || WISE || — || align=right | 3.8 km || 
|-id=765 bgcolor=#fefefe
| 448765 ||  || — || November 20, 2008 || Kitt Peak || Spacewatch || V || align=right data-sort-value="0.58" | 580 m || 
|-id=766 bgcolor=#fefefe
| 448766 ||  || — || December 12, 2004 || Kitt Peak || Spacewatch || — || align=right data-sort-value="0.81" | 810 m || 
|-id=767 bgcolor=#E9E9E9
| 448767 ||  || — || September 10, 2007 || Mount Lemmon || Mount Lemmon Survey || KON || align=right | 1.4 km || 
|-id=768 bgcolor=#FA8072
| 448768 ||  || — || August 16, 2007 || XuYi || PMO NEO || — || align=right | 1.0 km || 
|-id=769 bgcolor=#E9E9E9
| 448769 ||  || — || September 8, 2011 || Kitt Peak || Spacewatch || MAR || align=right data-sort-value="0.98" | 980 m || 
|-id=770 bgcolor=#E9E9E9
| 448770 ||  || — || March 16, 2010 || Kitt Peak || Spacewatch || — || align=right | 3.1 km || 
|-id=771 bgcolor=#E9E9E9
| 448771 ||  || — || September 13, 2007 || Kitt Peak || Spacewatch || — || align=right data-sort-value="0.82" | 820 m || 
|-id=772 bgcolor=#fefefe
| 448772 ||  || — || February 26, 2009 || Catalina || CSS || — || align=right data-sort-value="0.83" | 830 m || 
|-id=773 bgcolor=#E9E9E9
| 448773 ||  || — || October 9, 2007 || Kitt Peak || Spacewatch || — || align=right data-sort-value="0.78" | 780 m || 
|-id=774 bgcolor=#E9E9E9
| 448774 ||  || — || October 14, 2007 || Mount Lemmon || Mount Lemmon Survey || — || align=right data-sort-value="0.87" | 870 m || 
|-id=775 bgcolor=#E9E9E9
| 448775 ||  || — || September 22, 2011 || Kitt Peak || Spacewatch || — || align=right | 1.2 km || 
|-id=776 bgcolor=#fefefe
| 448776 ||  || — || May 9, 2010 || Mount Lemmon || Mount Lemmon Survey || V || align=right data-sort-value="0.67" | 670 m || 
|-id=777 bgcolor=#fefefe
| 448777 ||  || — || December 21, 2000 || Kitt Peak || Spacewatch || NYS || align=right data-sort-value="0.76" | 760 m || 
|-id=778 bgcolor=#E9E9E9
| 448778 ||  || — || September 20, 2011 || Catalina || CSS || MRX || align=right | 1.2 km || 
|-id=779 bgcolor=#E9E9E9
| 448779 ||  || — || December 13, 2007 || Socorro || LINEAR || — || align=right data-sort-value="0.94" | 940 m || 
|-id=780 bgcolor=#E9E9E9
| 448780 ||  || — || February 26, 2010 || WISE || WISE || EUN || align=right | 2.2 km || 
|-id=781 bgcolor=#fefefe
| 448781 ||  || — || July 25, 2010 || WISE || WISE || — || align=right | 2.1 km || 
|-id=782 bgcolor=#E9E9E9
| 448782 ||  || — || September 23, 2011 || Kitt Peak || Spacewatch || — || align=right | 2.8 km || 
|-id=783 bgcolor=#E9E9E9
| 448783 ||  || — || February 26, 2009 || Mount Lemmon || Mount Lemmon Survey || — || align=right | 1.8 km || 
|-id=784 bgcolor=#E9E9E9
| 448784 ||  || — || April 11, 2010 || Mount Lemmon || Mount Lemmon Survey || — || align=right data-sort-value="0.78" | 780 m || 
|-id=785 bgcolor=#fefefe
| 448785 ||  || — || September 3, 2007 || Catalina || CSS || — || align=right data-sort-value="0.82" | 820 m || 
|-id=786 bgcolor=#E9E9E9
| 448786 ||  || — || September 23, 2011 || Kitt Peak || Spacewatch || — || align=right | 2.7 km || 
|-id=787 bgcolor=#E9E9E9
| 448787 ||  || — || October 20, 2007 || Mount Lemmon || Mount Lemmon Survey || critical || align=right | 1.3 km || 
|-id=788 bgcolor=#E9E9E9
| 448788 ||  || — || November 8, 2007 || Mount Lemmon || Mount Lemmon Survey || — || align=right data-sort-value="0.67" | 670 m || 
|-id=789 bgcolor=#E9E9E9
| 448789 ||  || — || September 21, 2011 || Kitt Peak || Spacewatch || — || align=right | 1.8 km || 
|-id=790 bgcolor=#E9E9E9
| 448790 ||  || — || September 28, 2011 || Mount Lemmon || Mount Lemmon Survey || — || align=right | 2.0 km || 
|-id=791 bgcolor=#E9E9E9
| 448791 ||  || — || September 26, 2011 || Kitt Peak || Spacewatch || — || align=right | 1.5 km || 
|-id=792 bgcolor=#fefefe
| 448792 ||  || — || September 22, 2011 || Kitt Peak || Spacewatch || — || align=right data-sort-value="0.94" | 940 m || 
|-id=793 bgcolor=#fefefe
| 448793 ||  || — || March 24, 2006 || Mount Lemmon || Mount Lemmon Survey || — || align=right | 1.2 km || 
|-id=794 bgcolor=#E9E9E9
| 448794 ||  || — || October 28, 1994 || Kitt Peak || Spacewatch || — || align=right | 1.4 km || 
|-id=795 bgcolor=#E9E9E9
| 448795 ||  || — || October 21, 2007 || Mount Lemmon || Mount Lemmon Survey || — || align=right | 1.3 km || 
|-id=796 bgcolor=#E9E9E9
| 448796 ||  || — || December 16, 2007 || Mount Lemmon || Mount Lemmon Survey || — || align=right | 1.2 km || 
|-id=797 bgcolor=#fefefe
| 448797 ||  || — || September 9, 2011 || Kitt Peak || Spacewatch || MAS || align=right data-sort-value="0.82" | 820 m || 
|-id=798 bgcolor=#E9E9E9
| 448798 ||  || — || September 27, 2011 || Mount Lemmon || Mount Lemmon Survey || — || align=right | 2.4 km || 
|-id=799 bgcolor=#E9E9E9
| 448799 ||  || — || October 16, 2007 || Kitt Peak || Spacewatch || — || align=right data-sort-value="0.90" | 900 m || 
|-id=800 bgcolor=#E9E9E9
| 448800 ||  || — || December 17, 2007 || Catalina || CSS || — || align=right | 1.3 km || 
|}

448801–448900 

|-bgcolor=#E9E9E9
| 448801 ||  || — || May 25, 2006 || Kitt Peak || Spacewatch || KON || align=right | 2.7 km || 
|-id=802 bgcolor=#fefefe
| 448802 ||  || — || September 21, 2011 || Catalina || CSS || — || align=right data-sort-value="0.96" | 960 m || 
|-id=803 bgcolor=#E9E9E9
| 448803 ||  || — || November 8, 2007 || Kitt Peak || Spacewatch || — || align=right | 1.8 km || 
|-id=804 bgcolor=#E9E9E9
| 448804 ||  || — || June 19, 2006 || Kitt Peak || Spacewatch || — || align=right | 1.1 km || 
|-id=805 bgcolor=#fefefe
| 448805 ||  || — || August 28, 2011 || Siding Spring || SSS || — || align=right | 1.2 km || 
|-id=806 bgcolor=#E9E9E9
| 448806 ||  || — || April 24, 2006 || Kitt Peak || Spacewatch || — || align=right | 1.6 km || 
|-id=807 bgcolor=#fefefe
| 448807 ||  || — || August 12, 2007 || XuYi || PMO NEO || MAS || align=right data-sort-value="0.75" | 750 m || 
|-id=808 bgcolor=#E9E9E9
| 448808 ||  || — || October 18, 2011 || Mount Lemmon || Mount Lemmon Survey || — || align=right | 1.2 km || 
|-id=809 bgcolor=#E9E9E9
| 448809 ||  || — || April 16, 2005 || Kitt Peak || Spacewatch || — || align=right | 2.4 km || 
|-id=810 bgcolor=#E9E9E9
| 448810 ||  || — || September 14, 2007 || Mount Lemmon || Mount Lemmon Survey || — || align=right data-sort-value="0.71" | 710 m || 
|-id=811 bgcolor=#E9E9E9
| 448811 ||  || — || October 18, 2011 || Mount Lemmon || Mount Lemmon Survey || — || align=right | 1.3 km || 
|-id=812 bgcolor=#E9E9E9
| 448812 ||  || — || November 4, 2007 || Kitt Peak || Spacewatch || (5) || align=right data-sort-value="0.79" | 790 m || 
|-id=813 bgcolor=#fefefe
| 448813 ||  || — || September 12, 2007 || Mount Lemmon || Mount Lemmon Survey || MAS || align=right | 1.1 km || 
|-id=814 bgcolor=#E9E9E9
| 448814 ||  || — || October 21, 2007 || Mount Lemmon || Mount Lemmon Survey || — || align=right data-sort-value="0.90" | 900 m || 
|-id=815 bgcolor=#E9E9E9
| 448815 ||  || — || October 18, 2011 || Mount Lemmon || Mount Lemmon Survey || — || align=right data-sort-value="0.85" | 850 m || 
|-id=816 bgcolor=#d6d6d6
| 448816 ||  || — || November 17, 2006 || Mount Lemmon || Mount Lemmon Survey || EOS || align=right | 2.1 km || 
|-id=817 bgcolor=#E9E9E9
| 448817 ||  || — || November 14, 2007 || Kitt Peak || Spacewatch || — || align=right data-sort-value="0.54" | 540 m || 
|-id=818 bgcolor=#FFC2E0
| 448818 ||  || — || October 19, 2011 || Haleakala || Pan-STARRS || AMO +1km || align=right data-sort-value="0.95" | 950 m || 
|-id=819 bgcolor=#E9E9E9
| 448819 ||  || — || October 17, 2011 || Kitt Peak || Spacewatch || EUN || align=right | 1.1 km || 
|-id=820 bgcolor=#E9E9E9
| 448820 ||  || — || November 19, 2003 || Kitt Peak || Spacewatch || — || align=right data-sort-value="0.65" | 650 m || 
|-id=821 bgcolor=#E9E9E9
| 448821 ||  || — || October 17, 2011 || Kitt Peak || Spacewatch || — || align=right | 1.2 km || 
|-id=822 bgcolor=#E9E9E9
| 448822 ||  || — || December 17, 2007 || Mount Lemmon || Mount Lemmon Survey || NEM || align=right | 2.1 km || 
|-id=823 bgcolor=#E9E9E9
| 448823 ||  || — || November 14, 2007 || Kitt Peak || Spacewatch || (5) || align=right data-sort-value="0.79" | 790 m || 
|-id=824 bgcolor=#d6d6d6
| 448824 ||  || — || September 23, 2011 || Kitt Peak || Spacewatch || — || align=right | 2.6 km || 
|-id=825 bgcolor=#E9E9E9
| 448825 ||  || — || September 15, 2007 || Mount Lemmon || Mount Lemmon Survey || — || align=right data-sort-value="0.91" | 910 m || 
|-id=826 bgcolor=#E9E9E9
| 448826 ||  || — || November 19, 2007 || Mount Lemmon || Mount Lemmon Survey || — || align=right | 1.2 km || 
|-id=827 bgcolor=#E9E9E9
| 448827 ||  || — || December 16, 2007 || Mount Lemmon || Mount Lemmon Survey || — || align=right | 2.2 km || 
|-id=828 bgcolor=#E9E9E9
| 448828 ||  || — || November 13, 2007 || Kitt Peak || Spacewatch || — || align=right | 1.9 km || 
|-id=829 bgcolor=#E9E9E9
| 448829 ||  || — || November 19, 2003 || Kitt Peak || Spacewatch || — || align=right data-sort-value="0.65" | 650 m || 
|-id=830 bgcolor=#E9E9E9
| 448830 ||  || — || October 20, 2011 || Mount Lemmon || Mount Lemmon Survey || — || align=right data-sort-value="0.98" | 980 m || 
|-id=831 bgcolor=#E9E9E9
| 448831 ||  || — || November 3, 2007 || Kitt Peak || Spacewatch || — || align=right | 1.2 km || 
|-id=832 bgcolor=#E9E9E9
| 448832 ||  || — || October 18, 2011 || Mount Lemmon || Mount Lemmon Survey || (5) || align=right data-sort-value="0.79" | 790 m || 
|-id=833 bgcolor=#E9E9E9
| 448833 ||  || — || October 18, 2011 || Mount Lemmon || Mount Lemmon Survey || — || align=right data-sort-value="0.80" | 800 m || 
|-id=834 bgcolor=#E9E9E9
| 448834 ||  || — || September 15, 2007 || Mount Lemmon || Mount Lemmon Survey || (5) || align=right data-sort-value="0.81" | 810 m || 
|-id=835 bgcolor=#E9E9E9
| 448835 ||  || — || May 14, 2010 || WISE || WISE || — || align=right | 2.9 km || 
|-id=836 bgcolor=#E9E9E9
| 448836 ||  || — || October 19, 2011 || Kitt Peak || Spacewatch || — || align=right | 1.4 km || 
|-id=837 bgcolor=#E9E9E9
| 448837 ||  || — || October 19, 2011 || Kitt Peak || Spacewatch || — || align=right | 1.4 km || 
|-id=838 bgcolor=#E9E9E9
| 448838 ||  || — || December 27, 2003 || Kitt Peak || Spacewatch || — || align=right data-sort-value="0.86" | 860 m || 
|-id=839 bgcolor=#E9E9E9
| 448839 ||  || — || October 18, 2011 || Mount Lemmon || Mount Lemmon Survey || (5) || align=right data-sort-value="0.73" | 730 m || 
|-id=840 bgcolor=#E9E9E9
| 448840 ||  || — || March 19, 2009 || Kitt Peak || Spacewatch || — || align=right data-sort-value="0.95" | 950 m || 
|-id=841 bgcolor=#E9E9E9
| 448841 ||  || — || April 21, 2009 || Mount Lemmon || Mount Lemmon Survey || — || align=right | 1.5 km || 
|-id=842 bgcolor=#E9E9E9
| 448842 ||  || — || January 8, 2000 || Kitt Peak || Spacewatch || — || align=right data-sort-value="0.75" | 750 m || 
|-id=843 bgcolor=#E9E9E9
| 448843 ||  || — || January 5, 2003 || Socorro || LINEAR || DOR || align=right | 2.4 km || 
|-id=844 bgcolor=#E9E9E9
| 448844 ||  || — || September 21, 2011 || Kitt Peak || Spacewatch || — || align=right data-sort-value="0.90" | 900 m || 
|-id=845 bgcolor=#E9E9E9
| 448845 ||  || — || November 2, 2007 || Mount Lemmon || Mount Lemmon Survey || MAR || align=right | 1.1 km || 
|-id=846 bgcolor=#E9E9E9
| 448846 ||  || — || April 20, 2009 || Mount Lemmon || Mount Lemmon Survey || — || align=right | 1.7 km || 
|-id=847 bgcolor=#E9E9E9
| 448847 ||  || — || September 30, 2011 || Kitt Peak || Spacewatch || — || align=right | 1.3 km || 
|-id=848 bgcolor=#E9E9E9
| 448848 ||  || — || January 31, 2009 || Mount Lemmon || Mount Lemmon Survey || — || align=right | 1.3 km || 
|-id=849 bgcolor=#E9E9E9
| 448849 ||  || — || November 2, 2007 || Kitt Peak || Spacewatch || (5) || align=right data-sort-value="0.63" | 630 m || 
|-id=850 bgcolor=#E9E9E9
| 448850 ||  || — || March 27, 2009 || Mount Lemmon || Mount Lemmon Survey || — || align=right | 1.0 km || 
|-id=851 bgcolor=#E9E9E9
| 448851 ||  || — || December 29, 2008 || Mount Lemmon || Mount Lemmon Survey || — || align=right | 2.0 km || 
|-id=852 bgcolor=#E9E9E9
| 448852 ||  || — || October 20, 2011 || Kitt Peak || Spacewatch || DOR || align=right | 2.5 km || 
|-id=853 bgcolor=#E9E9E9
| 448853 ||  || — || November 19, 2007 || Kitt Peak || Spacewatch || — || align=right | 1.0 km || 
|-id=854 bgcolor=#E9E9E9
| 448854 ||  || — || September 22, 2011 || Mount Lemmon || Mount Lemmon Survey || — || align=right | 1.3 km || 
|-id=855 bgcolor=#E9E9E9
| 448855 ||  || — || October 20, 2011 || Kitt Peak || Spacewatch || — || align=right | 1.4 km || 
|-id=856 bgcolor=#E9E9E9
| 448856 ||  || — || March 27, 2009 || Mount Lemmon || Mount Lemmon Survey || NEM || align=right | 2.3 km || 
|-id=857 bgcolor=#E9E9E9
| 448857 ||  || — || September 24, 2011 || Mount Lemmon || Mount Lemmon Survey || — || align=right | 2.3 km || 
|-id=858 bgcolor=#E9E9E9
| 448858 ||  || — || October 1, 2011 || Mount Lemmon || Mount Lemmon Survey || — || align=right | 2.2 km || 
|-id=859 bgcolor=#E9E9E9
| 448859 ||  || — || January 8, 2000 || Kitt Peak || Spacewatch || — || align=right data-sort-value="0.86" | 860 m || 
|-id=860 bgcolor=#E9E9E9
| 448860 ||  || — || November 16, 2007 || Mount Lemmon || Mount Lemmon Survey || — || align=right | 2.5 km || 
|-id=861 bgcolor=#E9E9E9
| 448861 ||  || — || October 30, 2007 || Mount Lemmon || Mount Lemmon Survey || — || align=right | 1.2 km || 
|-id=862 bgcolor=#E9E9E9
| 448862 ||  || — || September 20, 1998 || Kitt Peak || Spacewatch || — || align=right data-sort-value="0.98" | 980 m || 
|-id=863 bgcolor=#E9E9E9
| 448863 ||  || — || October 24, 2011 || Mount Lemmon || Mount Lemmon Survey || JUN || align=right data-sort-value="0.96" | 960 m || 
|-id=864 bgcolor=#E9E9E9
| 448864 ||  || — || October 23, 2011 || Kitt Peak || Spacewatch || — || align=right | 1.2 km || 
|-id=865 bgcolor=#E9E9E9
| 448865 ||  || — || December 10, 2007 || Socorro || LINEAR || — || align=right data-sort-value="0.90" | 900 m || 
|-id=866 bgcolor=#E9E9E9
| 448866 ||  || — || December 3, 2007 || Kitt Peak || Spacewatch || — || align=right data-sort-value="0.99" | 990 m || 
|-id=867 bgcolor=#E9E9E9
| 448867 ||  || — || October 24, 2011 || Kitt Peak || Spacewatch || — || align=right | 1.0 km || 
|-id=868 bgcolor=#E9E9E9
| 448868 ||  || — || March 3, 2000 || Kitt Peak || Spacewatch ||  || align=right | 1.3 km || 
|-id=869 bgcolor=#E9E9E9
| 448869 ||  || — || November 12, 2007 || Mount Lemmon || Mount Lemmon Survey || — || align=right | 1.3 km || 
|-id=870 bgcolor=#E9E9E9
| 448870 ||  || — || September 14, 2006 || Catalina || CSS || — || align=right | 2.4 km || 
|-id=871 bgcolor=#E9E9E9
| 448871 ||  || — || November 16, 2007 || Mount Lemmon || Mount Lemmon Survey || — || align=right | 1.3 km || 
|-id=872 bgcolor=#E9E9E9
| 448872 ||  || — || December 16, 2007 || Kitt Peak || Spacewatch || (5) || align=right data-sort-value="0.65" | 650 m || 
|-id=873 bgcolor=#E9E9E9
| 448873 ||  || — || November 18, 2007 || Mount Lemmon || Mount Lemmon Survey || — || align=right data-sort-value="0.75" | 750 m || 
|-id=874 bgcolor=#E9E9E9
| 448874 ||  || — || December 16, 2007 || Kitt Peak || Spacewatch || — || align=right data-sort-value="0.92" | 920 m || 
|-id=875 bgcolor=#E9E9E9
| 448875 ||  || — || October 21, 2007 || Mount Lemmon || Mount Lemmon Survey || (5) || align=right data-sort-value="0.70" | 700 m || 
|-id=876 bgcolor=#E9E9E9
| 448876 ||  || — || September 29, 2011 || Kitt Peak || Spacewatch || — || align=right | 2.0 km || 
|-id=877 bgcolor=#E9E9E9
| 448877 ||  || — || October 17, 2007 || Mount Lemmon || Mount Lemmon Survey || MAR || align=right data-sort-value="0.70" | 700 m || 
|-id=878 bgcolor=#E9E9E9
| 448878 ||  || — || December 4, 2007 || Mount Lemmon || Mount Lemmon Survey || — || align=right | 1.3 km || 
|-id=879 bgcolor=#E9E9E9
| 448879 ||  || — || October 17, 2006 || Kitt Peak || Spacewatch || — || align=right | 2.1 km || 
|-id=880 bgcolor=#E9E9E9
| 448880 ||  || — || May 9, 2005 || Mount Lemmon || Mount Lemmon Survey || — || align=right | 1.6 km || 
|-id=881 bgcolor=#E9E9E9
| 448881 ||  || — || September 17, 1998 || Kitt Peak || Spacewatch || — || align=right | 1.2 km || 
|-id=882 bgcolor=#E9E9E9
| 448882 ||  || — || September 12, 1994 || Kitt Peak || Spacewatch || (5) || align=right data-sort-value="0.67" | 670 m || 
|-id=883 bgcolor=#E9E9E9
| 448883 ||  || — || October 22, 2011 || Kitt Peak || Spacewatch || RAF || align=right data-sort-value="0.84" | 840 m || 
|-id=884 bgcolor=#E9E9E9
| 448884 ||  || — || September 19, 2006 || Kitt Peak || Spacewatch || — || align=right | 3.1 km || 
|-id=885 bgcolor=#E9E9E9
| 448885 ||  || — || November 26, 2003 || Kitt Peak || Spacewatch || — || align=right | 1.1 km || 
|-id=886 bgcolor=#E9E9E9
| 448886 ||  || — || October 1, 2011 || Kitt Peak || Spacewatch || — || align=right | 1.7 km || 
|-id=887 bgcolor=#E9E9E9
| 448887 ||  || — || December 3, 2007 || Kitt Peak || Spacewatch || — || align=right | 1.7 km || 
|-id=888 bgcolor=#E9E9E9
| 448888 ||  || — || January 16, 2004 || Kitt Peak || Spacewatch || (5) || align=right data-sort-value="0.68" | 680 m || 
|-id=889 bgcolor=#E9E9E9
| 448889 ||  || — || November 18, 2007 || Mount Lemmon || Mount Lemmon Survey || (5) || align=right data-sort-value="0.64" | 640 m || 
|-id=890 bgcolor=#E9E9E9
| 448890 ||  || — || October 21, 2011 || Mount Lemmon || Mount Lemmon Survey || NEM || align=right | 2.5 km || 
|-id=891 bgcolor=#E9E9E9
| 448891 ||  || — || October 18, 2007 || Kitt Peak || Spacewatch || — || align=right data-sort-value="0.87" | 870 m || 
|-id=892 bgcolor=#E9E9E9
| 448892 ||  || — || October 1, 2011 || Kitt Peak || Spacewatch || — || align=right | 2.2 km || 
|-id=893 bgcolor=#E9E9E9
| 448893 ||  || — || November 19, 2007 || Kitt Peak || Spacewatch || (5) || align=right data-sort-value="0.81" | 810 m || 
|-id=894 bgcolor=#E9E9E9
| 448894 ||  || — || September 25, 2006 || Mount Lemmon || Mount Lemmon Survey || — || align=right | 1.8 km || 
|-id=895 bgcolor=#E9E9E9
| 448895 ||  || — || October 24, 2011 || Mount Lemmon || Mount Lemmon Survey || — || align=right | 1.7 km || 
|-id=896 bgcolor=#E9E9E9
| 448896 ||  || — || September 28, 2011 || Kitt Peak || Spacewatch || — || align=right | 2.7 km || 
|-id=897 bgcolor=#E9E9E9
| 448897 ||  || — || April 11, 2005 || Kitt Peak || Spacewatch || — || align=right | 1.6 km || 
|-id=898 bgcolor=#E9E9E9
| 448898 ||  || — || December 20, 2007 || Mount Lemmon || Mount Lemmon Survey || — || align=right data-sort-value="0.97" | 970 m || 
|-id=899 bgcolor=#E9E9E9
| 448899 ||  || — || December 7, 1999 || Kitt Peak || Spacewatch || — || align=right data-sort-value="0.83" | 830 m || 
|-id=900 bgcolor=#E9E9E9
| 448900 ||  || — || October 29, 2011 || Kitt Peak || Spacewatch || — || align=right | 1.3 km || 
|}

448901–449000 

|-bgcolor=#E9E9E9
| 448901 ||  || — || November 11, 2007 || Mount Lemmon || Mount Lemmon Survey || — || align=right | 2.4 km || 
|-id=902 bgcolor=#E9E9E9
| 448902 ||  || — || February 27, 2009 || Kitt Peak || Spacewatch || BRG || align=right | 1.3 km || 
|-id=903 bgcolor=#E9E9E9
| 448903 ||  || — || October 18, 2011 || Kitt Peak || Spacewatch || EUN || align=right | 1.3 km || 
|-id=904 bgcolor=#E9E9E9
| 448904 ||  || — || April 11, 2005 || Mount Lemmon || Mount Lemmon Survey || — || align=right | 1.7 km || 
|-id=905 bgcolor=#E9E9E9
| 448905 ||  || — || November 17, 2007 || Kitt Peak || Spacewatch || — || align=right data-sort-value="0.63" | 630 m || 
|-id=906 bgcolor=#E9E9E9
| 448906 ||  || — || April 20, 2009 || Kitt Peak || Spacewatch || — || align=right | 1.3 km || 
|-id=907 bgcolor=#E9E9E9
| 448907 ||  || — || September 15, 2006 || Kitt Peak || Spacewatch || — || align=right | 1.9 km || 
|-id=908 bgcolor=#E9E9E9
| 448908 ||  || — || October 24, 1995 || Kitt Peak || Spacewatch || — || align=right data-sort-value="0.86" | 860 m || 
|-id=909 bgcolor=#E9E9E9
| 448909 ||  || — || January 1, 2008 || Kitt Peak || Spacewatch || — || align=right data-sort-value="0.84" | 840 m || 
|-id=910 bgcolor=#E9E9E9
| 448910 ||  || — || January 16, 2004 || Kitt Peak || Spacewatch || — || align=right data-sort-value="0.83" | 830 m || 
|-id=911 bgcolor=#E9E9E9
| 448911 ||  || — || October 13, 2007 || Mount Lemmon || Mount Lemmon Survey || MAR || align=right data-sort-value="0.78" | 780 m || 
|-id=912 bgcolor=#E9E9E9
| 448912 ||  || — || October 18, 2011 || Kitt Peak || Spacewatch || — || align=right | 1.5 km || 
|-id=913 bgcolor=#E9E9E9
| 448913 ||  || — || April 7, 2010 || WISE || WISE || — || align=right | 2.3 km || 
|-id=914 bgcolor=#E9E9E9
| 448914 ||  || — || October 22, 2011 || Mount Lemmon || Mount Lemmon Survey || — || align=right data-sort-value="0.75" | 750 m || 
|-id=915 bgcolor=#E9E9E9
| 448915 ||  || — || April 30, 2009 || Mount Lemmon || Mount Lemmon Survey || — || align=right | 1.9 km || 
|-id=916 bgcolor=#fefefe
| 448916 ||  || — || September 14, 2007 || Mount Lemmon || Mount Lemmon Survey || V || align=right data-sort-value="0.65" | 650 m || 
|-id=917 bgcolor=#E9E9E9
| 448917 ||  || — || November 11, 2007 || Mount Lemmon || Mount Lemmon Survey || — || align=right | 1.3 km || 
|-id=918 bgcolor=#E9E9E9
| 448918 ||  || — || October 23, 2011 || Kitt Peak || Spacewatch || — || align=right | 1.6 km || 
|-id=919 bgcolor=#E9E9E9
| 448919 ||  || — || October 24, 2011 || Kitt Peak || Spacewatch || (5) || align=right data-sort-value="0.87" | 870 m || 
|-id=920 bgcolor=#fefefe
| 448920 ||  || — || February 9, 2005 || Mount Lemmon || Mount Lemmon Survey || — || align=right | 1.2 km || 
|-id=921 bgcolor=#E9E9E9
| 448921 ||  || — || March 18, 2009 || Kitt Peak || Spacewatch || — || align=right data-sort-value="0.98" | 980 m || 
|-id=922 bgcolor=#E9E9E9
| 448922 ||  || — || October 15, 1995 || Kitt Peak || Spacewatch || critical || align=right data-sort-value="0.75" | 750 m || 
|-id=923 bgcolor=#E9E9E9
| 448923 ||  || — || November 19, 2003 || Kitt Peak || Spacewatch || — || align=right data-sort-value="0.96" | 960 m || 
|-id=924 bgcolor=#E9E9E9
| 448924 ||  || — || September 23, 2011 || Kitt Peak || Spacewatch || — || align=right | 1.7 km || 
|-id=925 bgcolor=#E9E9E9
| 448925 ||  || — || September 26, 2011 || Catalina || CSS || — || align=right | 1.0 km || 
|-id=926 bgcolor=#E9E9E9
| 448926 ||  || — || November 1, 2011 || Catalina || CSS || — || align=right | 1.4 km || 
|-id=927 bgcolor=#E9E9E9
| 448927 ||  || — || October 6, 1994 || Kitt Peak || Spacewatch || — || align=right data-sort-value="0.98" | 980 m || 
|-id=928 bgcolor=#E9E9E9
| 448928 ||  || — || November 9, 2007 || Kitt Peak || Spacewatch || — || align=right | 1.8 km || 
|-id=929 bgcolor=#E9E9E9
| 448929 ||  || — || December 28, 1998 || Kitt Peak || Spacewatch || — || align=right | 1.9 km || 
|-id=930 bgcolor=#E9E9E9
| 448930 ||  || — || October 20, 2011 || Mount Lemmon || Mount Lemmon Survey || — || align=right | 2.1 km || 
|-id=931 bgcolor=#E9E9E9
| 448931 ||  || — || November 17, 2007 || Kitt Peak || Spacewatch || — || align=right | 1.1 km || 
|-id=932 bgcolor=#E9E9E9
| 448932 ||  || — || October 27, 2011 || Catalina || CSS || ADE || align=right | 2.6 km || 
|-id=933 bgcolor=#fefefe
| 448933 ||  || — || September 13, 2007 || Kitt Peak || Spacewatch || — || align=right data-sort-value="0.75" | 750 m || 
|-id=934 bgcolor=#E9E9E9
| 448934 ||  || — || January 17, 2008 || Mount Lemmon || Mount Lemmon Survey || — || align=right | 2.4 km || 
|-id=935 bgcolor=#E9E9E9
| 448935 ||  || — || November 5, 2007 || Kitt Peak || Spacewatch || — || align=right | 1.3 km || 
|-id=936 bgcolor=#E9E9E9
| 448936 ||  || — || November 15, 2011 || Kitt Peak || Spacewatch || — || align=right | 2.0 km || 
|-id=937 bgcolor=#E9E9E9
| 448937 ||  || — || September 24, 2011 || Mount Lemmon || Mount Lemmon Survey || — || align=right | 1.4 km || 
|-id=938 bgcolor=#E9E9E9
| 448938 ||  || — || September 24, 2011 || Mount Lemmon || Mount Lemmon Survey || — || align=right | 1.4 km || 
|-id=939 bgcolor=#E9E9E9
| 448939 ||  || — || October 20, 2011 || Mount Lemmon || Mount Lemmon Survey || — || align=right | 1.7 km || 
|-id=940 bgcolor=#E9E9E9
| 448940 ||  || — || December 19, 2003 || Socorro || LINEAR || — || align=right | 1.2 km || 
|-id=941 bgcolor=#E9E9E9
| 448941 ||  || — || December 14, 1998 || Kitt Peak || Spacewatch || — || align=right | 1.4 km || 
|-id=942 bgcolor=#E9E9E9
| 448942 ||  || — || January 15, 2004 || Kitt Peak || Spacewatch || EUN || align=right | 1.5 km || 
|-id=943 bgcolor=#E9E9E9
| 448943 ||  || — || October 20, 2011 || Mount Lemmon || Mount Lemmon Survey || — || align=right | 2.8 km || 
|-id=944 bgcolor=#E9E9E9
| 448944 ||  || — || March 28, 2009 || Kitt Peak || Spacewatch || PAD || align=right | 1.5 km || 
|-id=945 bgcolor=#E9E9E9
| 448945 ||  || — || November 16, 2011 || Mount Lemmon || Mount Lemmon Survey || — || align=right | 1.1 km || 
|-id=946 bgcolor=#E9E9E9
| 448946 ||  || — || November 13, 2007 || Kitt Peak || Spacewatch || (5) || align=right | 1.1 km || 
|-id=947 bgcolor=#E9E9E9
| 448947 ||  || — || September 25, 2006 || Mount Lemmon || Mount Lemmon Survey || — || align=right | 1.7 km || 
|-id=948 bgcolor=#E9E9E9
| 448948 ||  || — || May 1, 2009 || Mount Lemmon || Mount Lemmon Survey || — || align=right data-sort-value="0.90" | 900 m || 
|-id=949 bgcolor=#d6d6d6
| 448949 ||  || — || November 16, 2006 || Kitt Peak || Spacewatch || TRE || align=right | 3.5 km || 
|-id=950 bgcolor=#E9E9E9
| 448950 ||  || — || July 18, 2006 || Siding Spring || SSS || MAR || align=right | 1.3 km || 
|-id=951 bgcolor=#E9E9E9
| 448951 ||  || — || December 17, 2003 || Kitt Peak || Spacewatch || — || align=right | 1.0 km || 
|-id=952 bgcolor=#E9E9E9
| 448952 ||  || — || January 10, 2008 || Mount Lemmon || Mount Lemmon Survey || — || align=right | 1.3 km || 
|-id=953 bgcolor=#E9E9E9
| 448953 ||  || — || April 5, 2005 || Mount Lemmon || Mount Lemmon Survey || — || align=right data-sort-value="0.98" | 980 m || 
|-id=954 bgcolor=#E9E9E9
| 448954 ||  || — || December 5, 2002 || Kitt Peak || Spacewatch || — || align=right | 2.7 km || 
|-id=955 bgcolor=#E9E9E9
| 448955 ||  || — || October 22, 2011 || Kitt Peak || Spacewatch || — || align=right | 1.3 km || 
|-id=956 bgcolor=#E9E9E9
| 448956 ||  || — || December 19, 2007 || Mount Lemmon || Mount Lemmon Survey || GEF || align=right data-sort-value="0.99" | 990 m || 
|-id=957 bgcolor=#E9E9E9
| 448957 ||  || — || September 17, 2006 || Kitt Peak || Spacewatch || — || align=right | 1.6 km || 
|-id=958 bgcolor=#E9E9E9
| 448958 ||  || — || May 9, 2004 || Kitt Peak || Spacewatch || — || align=right | 1.8 km || 
|-id=959 bgcolor=#E9E9E9
| 448959 ||  || — || October 24, 2011 || Kitt Peak || Spacewatch || — || align=right | 1.6 km || 
|-id=960 bgcolor=#E9E9E9
| 448960 ||  || — || November 3, 2011 || Kitt Peak || Spacewatch || — || align=right | 2.1 km || 
|-id=961 bgcolor=#E9E9E9
| 448961 ||  || — || November 16, 2011 || Mount Lemmon || Mount Lemmon Survey || — || align=right | 1.1 km || 
|-id=962 bgcolor=#E9E9E9
| 448962 ||  || — || December 4, 2007 || Catalina || CSS || — || align=right | 1.5 km || 
|-id=963 bgcolor=#E9E9E9
| 448963 ||  || — || September 19, 2006 || Kitt Peak || Spacewatch || — || align=right | 1.8 km || 
|-id=964 bgcolor=#E9E9E9
| 448964 ||  || — || May 8, 2005 || Kitt Peak || Spacewatch || — || align=right | 1.5 km || 
|-id=965 bgcolor=#E9E9E9
| 448965 ||  || — || December 31, 2007 || Kitt Peak || Spacewatch || — || align=right | 2.1 km || 
|-id=966 bgcolor=#E9E9E9
| 448966 ||  || — || March 31, 2009 || Kitt Peak || Spacewatch || MAR || align=right | 1.0 km || 
|-id=967 bgcolor=#E9E9E9
| 448967 ||  || — || September 11, 1998 || Caussols || ODAS || — || align=right | 1.1 km || 
|-id=968 bgcolor=#E9E9E9
| 448968 ||  || — || August 28, 2006 || Kitt Peak || Spacewatch || — || align=right | 1.3 km || 
|-id=969 bgcolor=#E9E9E9
| 448969 ||  || — || March 12, 2000 || Kitt Peak || Spacewatch || — || align=right | 1.8 km || 
|-id=970 bgcolor=#E9E9E9
| 448970 ||  || — || January 13, 2008 || Kitt Peak || Spacewatch || — || align=right | 1.2 km || 
|-id=971 bgcolor=#E9E9E9
| 448971 ||  || — || November 4, 2007 || Mount Lemmon || Mount Lemmon Survey || — || align=right | 1.3 km || 
|-id=972 bgcolor=#FFC2E0
| 448972 ||  || — || December 10, 2001 || Socorro || LINEAR || AMO +1km || align=right | 1.3 km || 
|-id=973 bgcolor=#d6d6d6
| 448973 ||  || — || September 20, 2009 || Kitt Peak || Spacewatch || — || align=right | 3.6 km || 
|-id=974 bgcolor=#E9E9E9
| 448974 ||  || — || November 18, 2007 || Kitt Peak || Spacewatch || — || align=right | 3.3 km || 
|-id=975 bgcolor=#d6d6d6
| 448975 ||  || — || December 21, 2005 || Kitt Peak || Spacewatch || — || align=right | 2.9 km || 
|-id=976 bgcolor=#E9E9E9
| 448976 ||  || — || December 19, 2007 || Mount Lemmon || Mount Lemmon Survey || — || align=right | 1.4 km || 
|-id=977 bgcolor=#d6d6d6
| 448977 ||  || — || January 17, 2007 || Kitt Peak || Spacewatch || EOS || align=right | 1.5 km || 
|-id=978 bgcolor=#d6d6d6
| 448978 ||  || — || February 17, 2007 || Catalina || CSS || — || align=right | 2.9 km || 
|-id=979 bgcolor=#E9E9E9
| 448979 ||  || — || November 21, 2007 || Mount Lemmon || Mount Lemmon Survey || — || align=right | 1.0 km || 
|-id=980 bgcolor=#E9E9E9
| 448980 ||  || — || October 6, 2002 || Socorro || LINEAR || (1547) || align=right | 1.9 km || 
|-id=981 bgcolor=#E9E9E9
| 448981 ||  || — || October 28, 2006 || Catalina || CSS || EUN || align=right | 1.3 km || 
|-id=982 bgcolor=#E9E9E9
| 448982 ||  || — || October 29, 2006 || Catalina || CSS || GEF || align=right | 1.1 km || 
|-id=983 bgcolor=#E9E9E9
| 448983 ||  || — || November 4, 2007 || Mount Lemmon || Mount Lemmon Survey || — || align=right | 1.6 km || 
|-id=984 bgcolor=#d6d6d6
| 448984 ||  || — || October 2, 2010 || Mount Lemmon || Mount Lemmon Survey || — || align=right | 4.4 km || 
|-id=985 bgcolor=#E9E9E9
| 448985 ||  || — || February 3, 2008 || Kitt Peak || Spacewatch || — || align=right | 1.5 km || 
|-id=986 bgcolor=#d6d6d6
| 448986 ||  || — || September 13, 2005 || Kitt Peak || Spacewatch || — || align=right | 2.1 km || 
|-id=987 bgcolor=#E9E9E9
| 448987 ||  || — || December 25, 2011 || Kitt Peak || Spacewatch || — || align=right | 1.7 km || 
|-id=988 bgcolor=#E9E9E9
| 448988 Changzhong ||  ||  || March 23, 2009 || XuYi || PMO NEO || — || align=right | 2.1 km || 
|-id=989 bgcolor=#d6d6d6
| 448989 ||  || — || July 20, 2010 || WISE || WISE || — || align=right | 4.7 km || 
|-id=990 bgcolor=#d6d6d6
| 448990 ||  || — || April 15, 2007 || Catalina || CSS || — || align=right | 3.5 km || 
|-id=991 bgcolor=#E9E9E9
| 448991 ||  || — || August 27, 2006 || Kitt Peak || Spacewatch || — || align=right | 1.3 km || 
|-id=992 bgcolor=#d6d6d6
| 448992 ||  || — || March 9, 2002 || Kitt Peak || Spacewatch || — || align=right | 2.4 km || 
|-id=993 bgcolor=#E9E9E9
| 448993 ||  || — || March 10, 2008 || Mount Lemmon || Mount Lemmon Survey || — || align=right | 2.3 km || 
|-id=994 bgcolor=#E9E9E9
| 448994 ||  || — || November 11, 2001 || Anderson Mesa || LONEOS || — || align=right | 3.2 km || 
|-id=995 bgcolor=#E9E9E9
| 448995 ||  || — || December 27, 2011 || Kitt Peak || Spacewatch || AST || align=right | 1.8 km || 
|-id=996 bgcolor=#E9E9E9
| 448996 ||  || — || October 18, 2006 || Kitt Peak || Spacewatch || AEO || align=right | 1.2 km || 
|-id=997 bgcolor=#E9E9E9
| 448997 ||  || — || July 12, 2005 || Mount Lemmon || Mount Lemmon Survey || — || align=right | 2.7 km || 
|-id=998 bgcolor=#d6d6d6
| 448998 ||  || — || October 12, 2010 || Mount Lemmon || Mount Lemmon Survey || — || align=right | 2.7 km || 
|-id=999 bgcolor=#E9E9E9
| 448999 ||  || — || September 15, 2010 || Mount Lemmon || Mount Lemmon Survey || — || align=right | 2.0 km || 
|-id=000 bgcolor=#d6d6d6
| 449000 ||  || — || July 30, 2010 || WISE || WISE || — || align=right | 3.5 km || 
|}

References

External links 
 Discovery Circumstances: Numbered Minor Planets (445001)–(450000) (IAU Minor Planet Center)

0448